The following is a list of players, both past and current, who appeared at least in one game for the Philadelphia 76ers NBA franchise.



Players
Note: Statistics are correct through the end of the  season.

A to B

|-
|align="left"| || align="center"|F/C || align="left"|Duke || align="center"|1 || align="center"| || 3 || 30 || 8 || 0 || 2 || 10.0 || 2.7 || 0.0 || 0.7 || align=center|
|-
|align="left"| || align="center"|G || align="left"|Western Kentucky || align="center"|1 || align="center"| || 1 || 1 || 1 || 1 || 0 || 1.0 || 1.0 || 1.0 || 0.0 || align=center|
|-
|align="left"| || align="center"|F/C || align="left"|Turkey || align="center"|1 || align="center"| || 41 || 540 || 176 || 28 || 93 || 13.2 || 4.3 || 0.7 || 2.3 || align=center|
|-
|align="left"| || align="center"|F/C || align="left"|Temple || align="center"|3 || align="center"|– || 171 || 3,253 || 843 || 172 || 887 || 19.0 || 4.9 || 1.0 || 5.2 || align=center|
|-
|align="left"| || align="center"|F || align="left"|Duquesne || align="center"|2 || align="center"|– || 137 || 2,646 || 521 || 94 || 751 || 19.3 || 3.8 || 0.7 || 5.5 || align=center|
|-
|align="left"| || align="center"|F/C || align="left"|UNLV || align="center"|2 || align="center"|– || 26 || 151 || 40 || 1 || 34 || 5.8 || 1.5 || 0.0 || 1.3 || align=center|
|-
|align="left"| || align="center"|G/F || align="left"|Saint Joseph's || align="center"|1 || align="center"| || 5 || 27 || 11 || 4 || 7 || 5.4 || 2.2 || 0.8 || 1.4 || align=center|
|-
|align="left"| || align="center"|F || align="left"|Bradley || align="center"|1 || align="center"| || 13 || 48 || 12 || 1 || 17 || 3.7 || 0.9 || 0.1 || 1.3 || align=center|
|-
|align="left"| || align="center"|G/F || align="left"|Oklahoma State || align="center"|1 || align="center"| || 80 || 2,309 || 300 || 149 || 810 || 38.9 || 3.8 || 1.9 || 10.1 || align=center|
|-
|align="left"| || align="center"|G || align="left"|Virginia || align="center"|2 || align="center"|– || 62 || 1,037 || 189 || 59 || 439 || 16.7 || 3.0 || 1.0 || 7.1 || align=center|
|-
|align="left"| || align="center"|G/F || align="left"|Fresno State || align="center"|5 || align="center"|– || 393 || 10,742 || 1,530 || 625 || 5,138 || 27.3 || 3.9 || 1.6 || 13.1 || align=center|
|-
|align="left"| || align="center"|F || align="left"|Alabama || align="center"|1 || align="center"| || 8 || 32 || 4 || 2 || 15 || 4.0 || 0.5 || 0.3 || 1.9 || align=center|
|-
|align="left"| || align="center"|G/F || align="left"|Memphis || align="center"|1 || align="center"| || 14 || 234 || 22 || 33 || 52 || 16.7 || 1.6 || 2.4 || 3.7 || align=center|
|-
|align="left"| || align="center"|C || align="left"|Arizona State || align="center"|1 || align="center"| || 14 || 201 || 69 || 17 || 72 || 14.4 || 4.9 || 1.2 || 5.1 || align=center|
|-
|align="left"| || align="center"|C || align="left"|Santa Clara || align="center"|3 || align="center"|– || 131 || 2,123 || 692 || 142 || 756 || 16.2 || 5.3 || 1.1 || 5.8 || align=center|
|-
|align="left"| || align="center"|F/C || align="left"|Saint Joseph's || align="center"|1 || align="center"| || 43 || 979 || 226 || 46 || 380 || 22.8 || 5.3 || 1.1 || 8.8 || align=center|
|-
|align="left" bgcolor="#FFFF99"|^ (#34) || align="center"|F || align="left"|Auburn || align="center"|8 || align="center"|– || 610 || 22,761 || 7,079 || 2,276 || 14,184 || 37.3 || 11.6 || 3.7 || 23.3 || align=center|
|-
|align="left"| || align="center"|F || align="left"|UCLA || align="center"|1 || align="center"| || 50 || 538 || 97 || 22 || 149 || 10.8 || 1.9 || 0.4 || 3.0 || align=center|
|-
|align="left"| || align="center"|G/F || align="left"|Tennessee State || align="center"|2 || align="center"|– || 135 || 3,305 || 438 || 378 || 2,026 || 24.5 || 3.2 || 2.8 || 15.0 || align=center|
|-
|align="left"| || align="center"|G/F || align="left"|Oregon || align="center"|1 || align="center"| || 16 || 231 || 14 || 23 || 66 || 14.4 || 0.9 || 1.4 || 4.1 || align=center|
|-
|align="left" bgcolor="#FFCC00"|+ || align="center"|G || align="left"|Boston College || align="center"|2 || align="center"|– || 163 || 5,837 || 470 || 1,043 || 2,761 || 35.8 || 2.9 || 6.4 || 16.9 || align=center|
|-
|align="left"| || align="center"|F || align="left"|Temple || align="center"|1 || align="center"| || 21 || 105 || 28 || 3 || 26 || 5.0 || 1.3 || 0.1 || 1.2 || align=center|
|-
|align="left"| || align="center"|F/C || align="left"|Texas Tech || align="center"|2 || align="center"|– || 65 || 672 || 166 || 28 || 142 || 10.3 || 2.6 || 0.4 || 2.2 || align=center|
|-
|align="left"| || align="center"|G || align="left"|Arizona || align="center"|2 || align="center"|– || 42 || 996 || 92 || 67 || 340 || 23.7 || 2.2 || 1.6 || 8.1 || align=center|
|-
|align="left"| || align="center"|G/F || align="left"|Penn || align="center"|1 || align="center"| || 3 || 20 || 11 || 2 || 7 || 6.7 || 3.7 || 0.7 || 2.3 || align=center|
|-
|align="left"| || align="center"|G/F || align="left"|Italy || align="center"|1 || align="center"| || 28 || 737 || 51 || 45 || 380 || 26.3 || 1.8 || 1.6 || 13.6 || align=center|
|-
|align="left"| || align="center"|G || align="left"|FIU || align="center"|2 || align="center"|– || 79 || 920 || 112 || 71 || 259 || 11.6 || 1.4 || 0.9 || 3.3 || align=center|
|-
|align="left"| || align="center"|C || align="left"|Creighton || align="center"|2 || align="center"|– || 20 || 230 || 61 || 4 || 67 || 11.5 || 3.1 || 0.2 || 3.4 || align=center|
|-
|align="left"| || align="center"|G || align="left"|Notre Dame || align="center"|1 || align="center"| || 8 || 66 || 5 || 8 || 11 || 8.3 || 0.6 || 1.0 || 1.4 || align=center|
|-
|align="left"| || align="center"|G || align="left"|Bowling Green || align="center"|10 || align="center"|– || 687 || 13,649 || 1,722 || 1,497 || 5,550 || 19.9 || 2.5 || 2.2 || 8.1 || align=center|
|-
|align="left"| || align="center"|G || align="left"|UCLA || align="center"|4 || align="center"|– || 327 || 9,730 || 976 || 1,498 || 3,309 || 29.8 || 3.0 || 4.6 || 10.1 || align=center|
|-
|align="left" bgcolor="#FFCC00"|+ || align="center"|F/C || align="left"|USC || align="center"|1 || align="center"| || 48 || 1,558 || 442 || 94 || 858 || 32.5 || 9.2 || 2.0 || 17.9 || align=center|
|-
|align="left"| || align="center"|F || align="left"|Cincinnati || align="center"|1 || align="center"| || 72 || 1,426 || 368 || 44 || 259 || 19.8 || 5.1 || 0.6 || 3.6 || align=center|
|-
|align="left"| || align="center"|C || align="left"|Bridgeport || align="center"|4 || align="center"|– || 215 || 3,693 || 771 || 60 || 397 || 17.2 || 3.6 || 0.3 || 1.8 || align=center|
|-
|align="left" bgcolor="#CCFFCC"|x || align="center"|F || align="left"|UCLA || align="center"|1 || align="center"| || 44 || 639 || 165 || 40 || 207 || 14.5 || 3.8 || 0.9 || 4.7 || align=center|
|-
|align="left"| || align="center"|F || align="left"|Clemson || align="center"|1 || align="center"| || 33 || 494 || 122 || 27 || 156 || 15.0 || 3.7 || 0.8 || 4.7 || align=center|
|-
|align="left"| || align="center"|C || align="left"|Penn State || align="center"|1 || align="center"| || 31 || 204 || 38 || 8 || 24 || 6.6 || 1.2 || 0.3 || 0.8 || align=center|
|-
|align="left"| || align="center"|F || align="left"|Cal State Fullerton || align="center"|1 || align="center"| || 42 || 311 || 36 || 16 || 59 || 7.4 || 0.9 || 0.4 || 1.4 || align=center|
|-
|align="left"| || align="center"|G || align="left"|Penn || align="center"|2 || align="center"| || 14 || 49 || 3 || 2 || 15 || 3.5 || 0.2 || 0.1 || 1.1 || align=center|
|-
|align="left"| || align="center"|G || align="left"|Oregon State || align="center"|4 || align="center"|– || 229 || 5,564 || 394 || 713 || 2,043 || 24.3 || 1.7 || 3.1 || 8.9 || align=center|
|-
|align="left"| || align="center"|F || align="left"|Iowa State || align="center"|2 || align="center"|– || 17 || 121 || 19 || 9 || 30 || 7.1 || 1.1 || 0.5 || 1.8 || align=center|
|-
|align="left"| || align="center"|F/C || align="left"|Villanova || align="center"|2 || align="center"|– || 48 || 383 || 110 || 18 || 76 || 8.0 || 2.3 || 0.4 || 1.6 || align=center|
|-
|align="left"| || align="center"|C || align="left"|BYU || align="center"|3 || align="center"|– || 143 || 4,084 || 1,071 || 159 || 1,387 || 28.6 || 7.5 || 1.1 || 9.7 || align=center|
|-
|align="left"| || align="center"|F/C || align="left"|Australia || align="center"|1 || align="center"| || 36 || 251 || 68 || 7 || 59 || 7.0 || 1.9 || 0.2 || 1.6 || align=center|
|-
|align="left"| || align="center"|F || align="left"|Duke || align="center"|5 || align="center"|– || 263 || 7,983 || 1,883 || 381 || 3,341 || 30.4 || 7.2 || 1.4 || 12.7 || align=center|
|-
|align="left"| || align="center"|F || align="left"|Elon || align="center"|1 || align="center"| || 5 || 14 || 9 || 1 || 5 || 2.8 || 1.8 || 0.2 || 1.0 || align=center|
|-
|align="left"| || align="center"|G || align="left"|NYU || align="center"|1 || align="center"| || 10 || 111 || 15 || 12 || 33 || 11.1 || 1.5 || 1.2 || 3.3 || align=center|
|-
|align="left"| || align="center"|G/F || align="left"|Florida || align="center"|1 || align="center"| || 7 || 140 || 17 || 10 || 53 || 20.0 || 2.4 || 1.4 || 7.6 || align=center|
|-
|align="left"| || align="center"|C || align="left"|Slovenia || align="center"|1 || align="center"| || 7 || 36 || 12 || 0 || 5 || 5.1 || 1.7 || 0.0 || 0.7 || align=center|
|-
|align="left"| || align="center"|F/C || align="left"|Kansas || align="center"|2 || align="center"|– || 74 || 2,586 || 983 || 181 || 987 || 34.9 || 13.3 || 2.4 || 13.3 || align=center|
|-
|align="left"| || align="center"|G/F || align="left"|Virginia Tech || align="center"|2 || align="center"|– || 127 || 1,744 || 421 || 191 || 705 || 13.7 || 3.3 || 1.5 || 5.6 || align=center|
|-
|align="left"| || align="center"|G || align="left"|UC Irvine || align="center"|2 || align="center"|– || 154 || 2,347 || 158 || 513 || 747 || 15.2 || 1.0 || 3.3 || 4.9 || align=center|
|-
|align="left"| || align="center"|F || align="left"|Syracuse || align="center"|1 || align="center"| || 17 || 67 || 4 || 2 || 23 || 3.9 || 0.2 || 0.1 || 1.4 || align=center|
|-
|align="left"| || align="center"|G || align="left"|Northwest Florida State || align="center"|1 || align="center"| || 8 || 55 || 11 || 4 || 12 || 6.9 || 1.4 || 0.5 || 1.5 || align=center|
|-
|align="left"| || align="center"|F || align="left"|Glynn Academy (GA) || align="center"|1 || align="center"| || 22 || 269 || 74 || 9 || 41 || 12.2 || 3.4 || 0.4 || 1.9 || align=center|
|-
|align="left"| || align="center"|G || align="left"|NC State || align="center"|1 || align="center"| || 26 || 224 || 28 || 41 || 64 || 8.6 || 1.1 || 1.6 || 2.5 || align=center|
|-
|align="left"| || align="center"|F/C || align="left"|George Washington || align="center"|1 || align="center"| || 9 || 162 || 37 || 3 || 26 || 18.0 || 4.1 || 0.3 || 2.9 || align=center|
|-
|align="left"| || align="center"|F/C || align="left"|La Salle || align="center"|4 || align="center"|– || 287 || 4,115 || 934 || 341 || 1,849 || 14.3 || 3.3 || 1.2 || 6.4 || align=center|
|-
|align="left"| || align="center"|F/C || align="left"|Seton Hall || align="center"|1 || align="center"| || 11 || 77 || 16 || 1 || 12 || 7.0 || 1.5 || 0.1 || 1.1 || align=center|
|-
|align="left"| || align="center"|G || align="left"|Clemson || align="center"|2 || align="center"|– || 128 || 2,217 || 319 || 141 || 614 || 17.3 || 2.5 || 1.1 || 4.8 || align=center|
|-
|align="left"| || align="center"|G/F || align="left"|Creighton || align="center"|1 || align="center"| || 47 || 573 || 74 || 17 || 248 || 12.2 || 1.6 || 0.4 || 5.3 || align=center|
|-
|align="left"| || align="center"|G/F || align="left"|Minnesota || align="center"|1 || align="center"| || 53 || 1,564 || 164 || 96 || 812 || 29.5 || 3.1 || 1.8 || 15.3 || align=center|
|-
|align="left"| || align="center"|G/F || align="left"|Marquette || align="center"|1 || align="center"| || 55 || 1,824 || 290 || 220 || 1,002 || 33.2 || 5.3 || 4.0 || 18.2 || align=center|
|}

C

|-
|align="left"| || align="center"|F || align="left"|Bradley || align="center"|2 || align="center"|– || 125 || 2,241 || 646 || 118 || 819 || 17.9 || 5.2 || 0.9 || 6.6 || align=center|
|-
|align="left"| || align="center"|F/C || align="left"|San Diego State || align="center"|1 || align="center"| || 82 || 1,247 || 320 || 43 || 151 || 15.2 || 3.9 || 0.5 || 1.8 || align=center|
|-
|align="left"| || align="center"|G || align="left"|St. John's || align="center"|2 || align="center"|– || 104 || 937 || 149 || 148 || 492 || 16.2 || 1.4 || 1.4 || 4.7 || align=center|
|-
|align="left"| || align="center"|F/C || align="left"|Lamar || align="center"|1 || align="center"| || 27 || 365 || 111 || 7 || 72 || 13.5 || 4.1 || 0.3 || 2.7 || align=center|
|-
|align="left"| || align="center"|G/F || align="left"|CC San Francisco || align="center"|1 || align="center"| || 13 || 239 || 27 || 15 || 64 || 18.4 || 2.1 || 1.2 || 4.9 || align=center|
|-
|align="left"| || align="center"|G || align="left"|Murray State || align="center"|2 || align="center"|– || 99 || 2,535 || 228 || 206 || 1,124 || 25.6 || 2.3 || 2.1 || 11.4 || align=center|
|-
|align="left"| || align="center"|G || align="left"|La Salle || align="center"|1 || align="center"| || 19 || 335 || 36 || 52 || 117 || 17.6 || 1.9 || 2.7 || 6.2 || align=center|
|-
|align="left"| || align="center"|F || align="left"|Memphis || align="center"|3 || align="center"|– || 205 || 3,065 || 414 || 95 || 1,170 || 15.0 || 2.0 || 0.5 || 5.7 || align=center|
|-
|align="left"| || align="center"|G || align="left"|Indiana || align="center"|1 || align="center"| || 4 || 36 || 1 || 1 || 15 || 9.0 || 0.3 || 0.3 || 3.8 || align=center|
|-
|align="left"| || align="center"|G/F || align="left"|Mount St. Mary's || align="center"|6 || align="center"|– || 409 || 14,459 || 1,826 || 1,720 || 7,673 || 35.4 || 4.5 || 4.2 || 18.8 || align=center|
|-
|align="left"| || align="center"|G || align="left"|Syracuse || align="center"|2 || align="center"|– || 111 || 3,805 || 691 || 743 || 1,780 || 34.3 || 6.2 || 6.7 || 16.0 || align=center|
|-
|align="left"| || align="center"|F/C || align="left"|Hardin-Simmons || align="center"|5 || align="center"|– || 251 || 4,160 || 1,255 || 166 || 762 || 16.6 || 5.0 || 0.7 || 3.0 || align=center|
|-
|align="left"| || align="center"|F || align="left"|South Alabama || align="center"|1 || align="center"| || 64 || 1,092 || 272 || 21 || 494 || 17.1 || 4.3 || 0.3 || 7.7 || align=center|
|-
|align="left" bgcolor="#FFFF99"|^ || align="center"|G/F || align="left"|Buffalo East HS (NY) || align="center"|4 || align="center"|– || 202 || 1,151 || 261 || 648 || 1,591 || 12.4 || 1.8 || 3.2 || 7.9 || align=center|
|-
|align="left" bgcolor="#FFFF99"|^ (#13) || align="center"|C || align="left"|Kansas || align="center"|4 || align="center"|– || 277 || 12,813 || 6,632 || 1,879 || 7,651 || bgcolor="#CFECEC"|46.3 || bgcolor="#CFECEC"|23.9 || 6.8 || bgcolor="#CFECEC"|27.6 || align=center|
|-
|align="left"| || align="center"|F/C || align="left"|Utah || align="center"|1 || align="center"| || 1 || 10 || 2 || 0 || 6 || 10.0 || 2.0 || 0.0 || 6.0 || align=center|
|-
|align="left"| || align="center"|F || align="left"|DePaul || align="center"|1 || align="center"| || 36 || 951 || 168 || 72 || 241 || 26.4 || 4.7 || 2.0 || 6.7 || align=center|
|-
|align="left"| || align="center"|F/C || align="left"|Wake Forest || align="center"|2 || align="center"|– || 81 || 1,257 || 465 || 56 || 711 || 15.5 || 5.7 || 0.7 || 8.8 || align=center|
|-
|align="left" bgcolor="#FFFF99"|^ (#10) || align="center"|G || align="left"|West Texas A&M || align="center"|11 || align="center"|– || 853 || 28,583 || 2,538 || bgcolor="#CFECEC"|6,212 || 10,429 || 33.5 || 3.0 || 7.3 || 12.2 || align=center|
|-
|align="left"| || align="center"|F || align="left"|Canisius || align="center"|2 || align="center"|– || 63 ||  || 15 || 49 || 181 ||  || 1.1 || 0.8 || 2.9 || align=center|
|-
|align="left"| || align="center"|G || align="left"|Minnesota || align="center"|4 || align="center"|– || 241 || 8,203 || 960 || 1,123 || 4,381 || 34.0 || 4.0 || 4.7 || 18.2 || align=center|
|-
|align="left"| || align="center"|G || align="left"|Hofstra || align="center"|1 || align="center"| || 67 || 1,528 || 160 || 198 || 480 || 22.8 || 2.4 || 3.0 || 7.2 || align=center|
|-
|align="left"| || align="center"|F || align="left"|Maryland || align="center"|2 || align="center"|– || 101 || 1,544 || 354 || 40 || 591 || 15.3 || 3.5 || 0.4 || 5.9 || align=center|
|-
|align="left"| || align="center"|F || align="left"|Syracuse || align="center"|6 || align="center"|–– || 283 || 9,196 || 2,383 || 600 || 3,943 || 32.5 || 8.4 || 2.1 || 13.9 || align=center|
|-
|align="left" bgcolor="#FFCC00"|+ || align="center"|G/F || align="left"|Illinois State || align="center"|8 || align="center"|– || 415 || 13,945 || 1,339 || 1,368 || 7,427 || 33.6 || 3.2 || 3.3 || 17.9 || align=center|
|-
|align="left"| || align="center"|G || align="left"|New Mexico State || align="center"|2 || align="center"|– || 55 || 1,001 || 84 || 142 || 330 || 18.2 || 1.5 || 2.6 || 6.0 || align=center|
|-
|align="left"| || align="center"|G/F || align="left"|Fordham || align="center"|4 || align="center"|– || 254 || 7,145 || 1,495 || 598 || 3,075 || 28.1 || 5.9 || 2.4 || 12.1 || align=center|
|-
|align="left"| || align="center"|G || align="left"|Georgia State || align="center"|1 || align="center"| || 23 || 110 || 10 || 9 || 74 || 4.8 || 0.4 || 0.4 || 3.2 || align=center|
|-
|align="left"| || align="center"|G || align="left"|Georgetown || align="center"|1 || align="center"| || 60 ||  ||  || 109 || 309 ||  ||  || 1.8 || 5.2 || align=center|
|-
|align="left" bgcolor="#FFCC00"|+ || align="center"|G || align="left"|Niagara || align="center"|10 || align="center"|–– || 615 || 18,624 || 2,333 || 2,901 || 7,957 || 30.3 || 3.8 || 4.7 || 12.9 || align=center|
|-
|align="left"| || align="center"|F/C || align="left"|Oregon State || align="center"|1 || align="center"| || 7 || 47 || 16 || 3 || 10 || 6.7 || 2.3 || 0.4 || 1.4 || align=center|
|-
|align="left"| || align="center"|G || align="left"|Saint Joseph's || align="center"|1 || align="center"| || 24 || 317 || 22 || 22 || 101 || 13.2 || 0.9 || 0.9 || 4.2 || align=center|
|-
|align="left"| || align="center"|F || align="left"|Southern Miss || align="center"|1 || align="center"| || 4 || 52 || 9 || 0 || 12 || 13.0 || 2.3 || 0.0 || 3.0 || align=center|
|-
|align="left"| || align="center"|F || align="left"|Tennessee State || align="center"|5 || align="center"|– || 297 || 8,950 || 1,671 || 474 || 3,821 || 30.1 || 5.6 || 1.6 || 12.9 || align=center|
|-
|align="left"| || align="center"|G/F || align="left"|St. Bonaventure || align="center"|1 || align="center"| || 36 || 449 || 69 || 54 || 180 || 12.5 || 1.9 || 1.5 || 5.0 || align=center|
|-
|align="left"| || align="center"|F || align="left"|DePaul || align="center"|1 || align="center"| || 44 || 656 || 148 || 21 || 233 || 14.9 || 3.4 || 0.5 || 5.3 || align=center|
|-
|align="left"| || align="center"|G || align="left"|Pittsburgh || align="center"|1 || align="center"| || 58 || 501 || 52 || 60 || 192 || 8.6 || 0.9 || 1.0 || 3.3 || align=center|
|-
|align="left" bgcolor="#FFFF99"|^ (#32) || align="center"|F/C || align="left"|North Carolina || align="center"|9 || align="center"|–– || 654 || 22,406 || 6,638 || 2,625 || 13,626 || 34.3 || 10.1 || 4.0 || 20.8 || align=center|
|-
|align="left"| || align="center"|C || align="left"|Temple || align="center"|1 || align="center"| || 1 || 1 || 2 || 0 || 0 || 1.0 || 2.0 || 0.0 || 0.0 || align=center|
|-
|align="left"| || align="center"|F/C || align="left"|Detroit Mercy || align="center"|3 || align="center"|– || 191 || 2,471 || 694 || 100 || 817 || 12.9 || 3.6 || 0.5 || 4.3 || align=center|
|-
|align="left"| || align="center"|G/F || align="left"|Georgia Southern || align="center"|1 || align="center"| || 10 || 43 || 1 || 1 || 9 || 4.3 || 0.1 || 0.1 || 0.9 || align=center|
|}

D to E

|-
|align="left"| || align="center"|C || align="left"|Seton Hall || align="center"|8 || align="center"|– || 582 || 15,339 || 4,844 || 277 || 4,710 || 26.4 || 8.3 || 0.5 || 8.1 || align=center|
|-
|align="left"| || align="center"|G || align="left"|Bowling Green || align="center"|1 || align="center"| || 4 || 35 || 5 || 2 || 6 || 8.8 || 1.3 || 0.5 || 1.5 || align=center|
|-
|align="left"| || align="center"|G || align="left"|Mt. SAC || align="center"|1 || align="center"| || 5 || 63 || 7 || 4 || 23 || 12.6 || 1.4 || 0.8 || 4.6 || align=center|
|-
|align="left"| || align="center"|F || align="left"|BYU || align="center"|2 || align="center"|– || 71 || 954 || 182 || 56 || 270 || 13.4 || 2.6 || 0.8 || 3.8 || align=center|
|-
|align="left"| || align="center"|F || align="left"|Wyoming || align="center"|1 || align="center"| || 42 || 328 || 79 || 12 || 117 || 7.8 || 1.9 || 0.3 || 2.8 || align=center|
|-
|align="left"| || align="center"|G/F || align="left"|Texas Tech || align="center"|2 || align="center"|– || 146 || 2,611 || 481 || 208 || 921 || 17.9 || 3.3 || 1.4 || 6.3 || align=center|
|-
|align="left"| || align="center"|F || align="left"|Tennessee State || align="center"|1 || align="center"| || 1 || 2 || 1 || 0 || 2 || 2.0 || 1.0 || 0.0 || 2.0 || align=center|
|-
|align="left"| || align="center"|C || align="left"|Maynard Evans HS (FL) || align="center"|7 || align="center"|– || 448 || 10,359 || 3,008 || 553 || 5,009 || 23.1 || 6.7 || 1.2 || 11.2 || align=center|
|-
|align="left"| || align="center"|G || align="left"|Duke || align="center"|5 || align="center"|– || 313 || 8,745 || 749 || 1,798 || 3,343 || 27.9 || 2.4 || 5.7 || 10.7 || align=center|
|-
|align="left"| || align="center"|C || align="left"|USC || align="center"|1 || align="center"| || 11 || 150 || 49 || 3 || 37 || 13.6 || 4.5 || 0.3 || 3.4 || align=center|
|-
|align="left"| || align="center"|G || align="left"|King's || align="center"|1 || align="center"| || 34 || 410 || 100 || 36 || 170 || 12.1 || 2.9 || 1.1 || 5.0 || align=center|
|-
|align="left"| || align="center"|F/C || align="left"|Cincinnati || align="center"|5 || align="center"|–– || 302 || 4,574 || 1,577 || 239 || 1,882 || 15.1 || 5.2 || 0.8 || 6.2 || align=center|
|-
|align="left"| || align="center"|G || align="left"|UCLA || align="center"|2 || align="center"| || 15 || 234 || 16 || 47 || 48 || 15.6 || 1.1 || 3.1 || 3.2 || align=center|
|-
|align="left"| || align="center"|F || align="left"|Oklahoma State || align="center"|1 || align="center"| || 39 || 739 || 99 || 44 || 241 || 18.9 || 2.5 || 1.1 || 6.2 || align=center|
|-
|align="left"| || align="center"|G || align="left"|South Carolina || align="center"|2 || align="center"|– || 36 || 376 || 35 || 62 || 162 || 10.4 || 1.0 || 1.7 || 4.5 || align=center|
|-
|align="left"| || align="center"|F || align="left"|La Salle || align="center"|1 || align="center"| || 27 || 270 || 62 || 10 || 90 || 10.0 || 2.3 || 0.4 || 3.3 || align=center|
|-
|align="left"| || align="center"|F || align="left"|Loyola (IL) || align="center"|1 || align="center"| || 2 || 12 || 2 || 0 || 4 || 6.0 || 1.0 || 0.0 || 2.0 || align=center|
|-
|align="left"| || align="center"|F || align="left"|Wright State || align="center"|1 || align="center"| || 3 || 44 || 14 || 4 || 6 || 14.7 || 4.7 || 1.3 || 2.0 || align=center|
|-
|align="left"| || align="center"|G || align="left"|Cleveland State || align="center"|3 || align="center"|– || 183 || 2,211 || 171 || 356 || 894 || 12.1 || 0.9 || 1.9 || 4.9 || align=center|
|-
|align="left"| || align="center"|G/F || align="left"|American International || align="center"|1 || align="center"| || 3 || 20 || 1 || 1 || 6 || 6.7 || 0.3 || 0.3 || 2.0 || align=center|
|-
|align="left"| || align="center"|F/C || align="left"|St. John's || align="center"|4 || align="center"|– || 261 || 7,947 || 2,338 || 463 || 2,529 || 30.4 || 9.0 || 1.8 || 9.7 || align=center|
|-
|align="left"| || align="center"|C || align="left"|California || align="center"|2 || align="center"| || 6 || 20 || 2 || 1 || 4 || 3.3 || 0.3 || 0.2 || 0.7 || align=center|
|-
|align="left" bgcolor="#FBCEB1"|* || align="center"|C || align="left"|Kansas || align="center"|3 || align="center"|– || 158 || 4,852 || 1,804 || 499 || 3,833 || 30.7 || 11.4 || 3.2 || 24.3 || align=center|
|-
|align="left" bgcolor="#CCFFCC"|x || align="center"|F || align="left"|Long Beach State || align="center"|1 || align="center"| || 18 || 281 || 65 || 14 || 95 || 15.6 || 3.6 || 0.8 || 5.3 || align=center|
|-
|align="left" bgcolor="#FFFF99"|^ (#6) || align="center"|G/F || align="left"|UMass || align="center"|11 || align="center"|– || 836 || 28,677 || 5,601 || 3,224 || 18,364 || 34.3 || 6.7 || 3.9 || 22.0 || align=center|
|-
|align="left"| || align="center"|F || align="left"|Iowa || align="center"|2 || align="center"|– || 160 || 3,016 || 972 || 91 || 687 || 18.9 || 6.1 || 0.6 || 4.3 || align=center|
|}

F to G

|-
|align="left"| || align="center"|G/F || align="left"|Indiana || align="center"|2 || align="center"|– || 141 || 2,542 || 332 || 262 || 887 || 18.0 || 2.4 || 1.9 || 6.3 || align=center|
|-
|align="left"| || align="center"|G || align="left"|Alabama || align="center"|1 || align="center"| || 2 || 13 || 5 || 0 || 6 || 6.5 || 2.5 || 0.0 || 3.0 || align=center|
|-
|align="left"| || align="center"|F || align="left"|Tennessee Tech || align="center"|1 || align="center"| || 19 || 73 || 25 || 7 || 43 || 3.8 || 1.3 || 0.4 || 2.3 || align=center|
|-
|align="left"| || align="center"|G || align="left"|Mississippi Valley State || align="center"|1 || align="center"| || 5 || 98 || 20 || 9 || 19 || 19.6 || 4.0 || 1.8 || 3.8 || align=center|
|-
|align="left"| || align="center"|F || align="left"|Miami (OH) || align="center"|2 || align="center"|– || 140 || 2,587 || 423 || 151 || 1,241 || 18.5 || 3.0 || 1.1 || 8.9 || align=center|
|-
|align="left"| || align="center"|G || align="left"|Penn State || align="center"|1 || align="center"| || 6 || 171 || 19 || 43 || 34 || 28.5 || 3.2 || 7.2 || 5.7 || align=center|
|-
|align="left"| || align="center"|G || align="left"|Guilford || align="center"|4 || align="center"|– || 245 || 5,709 || 593 || 706 || 3,165 || 23.3 || 2.4 || 2.9 || 12.9 || align=center|
|-
|align="left"| || align="center"|F || align="left"|Vanderbilt || align="center"|1 || align="center"| || 35 || 265 || 54 || 14 || 106 || 7.6 || 1.5 || 0.4 || 3.0 || align=center|
|-
|align="left"| || align="center"|G || align="left"|Washington || align="center"|2 || align="center"|– || 33 || 680 || 113 || 112 || 255 || 20.6 || 3.4 || 3.4 || 7.7 || align=center|
|-
|align="left"| || align="center"|G/F || align="left"|Michigan State || align="center"|1 || align="center"| || 32 || 174 || 39 || 19 || 84 || 5.4 || 1.2 || 0.6 || 2.6 || align=center|
|-
|align="left" bgcolor="#FFCC00"|+ || align="center"|G/F || align="left"|Syracuse || align="center"|6 || align="center"|– || 307 || 3,680 || 448 || 626 || 2,997 || 19.4 || 1.8 || 2.0 || 9.8 || align=center|
|-
|align="left"| || align="center"|F || align="left"|Fairfield || align="center"|1 || align="center"| || 2 || 5 || 0 || 0 || 0 || 2.5 || 0.0 || 0.0 || 0.0 || align=center|
|-
|align="left"| || align="center"|G || align="left"|Loyola Marymount || align="center"|2 || align="center"| || 20 || 361 || 23 || 59 || 65 || 18.1 || 1.2 || 3.0 || 3.3 || align=center|
|-
|align="left"| || align="center"|F || align="left"|Oregon State || align="center"|7 || align="center"|– || 475 || 10,370 || 2,695 || 524 || 5,454 || 21.8 || 5.7 || 1.1 || 11.5 || align=center|
|-
|align="left"| || align="center"|C || align="left"|Georgia Tech || align="center"|4 || align="center"|– || 154 || 3,524 || 894 || 111 || 1,519 || 22.9 || 5.8 || 0.7 || 9.9 || align=center|
|-
|align="left"| || align="center"|F/C || align="left"|UNLV || align="center"|3 || align="center"|– || 211 || 6,208 || 1,496 || 312 || 3,107 || 29.4 || 7.1 || 1.5 || 14.7 || align=center|
|-
|align="left"| || align="center"|G/F || align="left"|Croatia || align="center"|1 || align="center"| || 12 || 110 || 14 || 11 || 37 || 9.2 || 1.2 || 0.9 || 3.1 || align=center|
|-
|align="left"| || align="center"|C || align="left"|Duke || align="center"|4 || align="center"|– || 240 || 7,956 || 2,151 || 383 || 3,585 || 33.2 || 9.0 || 1.6 || 14.9 || align=center|
|-
|align="left"| || align="center"|F || align="left"|New Mexico || align="center"|1 || align="center"| || 9 || 71 || 18 || 2 || 17 || 7.9 || 2.0 || 0.2 || 1.9 || align=center|
|-
|align="left"| || align="center"|G || align="left"|DePaul || align="center"|1 || align="center"| || 23 || 258 || 18 || 24 || 75 || 11.2 || 0.8 || 1.0 || 3.3 || align=center|
|-
|align="left"| || align="center"|F/C || align="left"|Roberto Clemente HS (IL) || align="center"|1 || align="center"| || 23 || 323 || 105 || 20 || 118 || 14.0 || 4.6 || 0.9 || 5.1 || align=center|
|-
|align="left"| || align="center"|G || align="left"|Indiana || align="center"|3 || align="center"|– || 128 || 1,792 || 163 || 143 || 645 || 14.0 || 1.3 || 1.1 || 5.0 || align=center|
|-
|align="left"| || align="center"|G || align="left"|TCNJ || align="center"|3 || align="center"|– || 138 || 2,110 || 153 || 465 || 463 || 15.3 || 1.1 || 3.4 || 3.4 || align=center|
|-
|align="left"| || align="center"|F || align="left"|Oklahoma || align="center"|1 || align="center"| || 47 || 798 || 110 || 23 || 146 || 17.0 || 2.3 || 0.5 || 3.1 || align=center|
|-
|align="left"| || align="center"|F || align="left"|Syracuse || align="center"|3 || align="center"|– || 144 || 3,484 || 565 || 214 || 1,176 || 24.2 || 3.9 || 1.5 || 8.2 || align=center|
|-
|align="left"| || align="center"|G/F || align="left"|Iowa State || align="center"|1 || align="center"| || 47 || 1,098 || 149 || 74 || 389 || 23.4 || 3.2 || 1.6 || 8.3 || align=center|
|-
|align="left"| || align="center"|F/C || align="left"|Michigan State || align="center"|2 || align="center"|– || 109 || 1,162 || 452 || 68 || 526 || 10.7 || 4.1 || 0.6 || 4.8 || align=center|
|-
|align="left"| || align="center"|F || align="left"|Wake Forest || align="center"|2 || align="center"|– || 40 || 404 || 63 || 13 || 156 || 10.1 || 1.6 || 0.3 || 3.9 || align=center|
|-
|align="left"| || align="center"|F || align="left"|LIU Brooklyn || align="center"|1 || align="center"| || 5 || 32 || 3 || 0 || 3 || 6.4 || 0.6 || 0.0 || 0.6 || align=center|
|-
|align="left"| || align="center"|G || align="left"|Michigan || align="center"|1 || align="center"| || 79 || 2,248 || 137 || 413 || 793 || 28.5 || 1.7 || 5.2 || 10.0 || align=center|
|-
|align="left"| || align="center"|G/F || align="left"|Iona || align="center"|1 || align="center"| || 35 || 332 || 34 || 16 || 149 || 9.5 || 1.0 || 0.5 || 4.3 || align=center|
|-
|align="left"| || align="center"|G || align="left"|Detroit Mercy || align="center"|7 || align="center"|– || 422 || 9,179 || 808 || 731 || 3,954 || 21.8 || 1.9 || 1.7 || 9.4 || align=center|
|-
|align="left"| || align="center"|F || align="left"|Maryland || align="center"|2 || align="center"|– || 25 || 329 || 83 || 11 || 122 || 13.2 || 3.3 || 0.4 || 4.9 || align=center|
|-
|align="left" bgcolor="#FFFF99"|^ (#15) || align="center"|G/F || align="left"|Marshall || align="center" bgcolor="#CFECEC"|15 || align="center"|– || bgcolor="#CFECEC"|1,122 || bgcolor="#CFECEC"|39,788 || 5,665 || 4,540 || bgcolor="#CFECEC"|21,586 || 35.5 || 5.0 || 4.0 || 19.2 || align=center|
|-
|align="left"| || align="center"|G/F || align="left"|Saint Joseph's || align="center"|5 || align="center"|– || 304 || 4,821 || 579 || 622 || 1,427 || 15.9 || 1.9 || 2.0 || 4.7 || align=center|
|}

H

|-
|align="left"| || align="center"|C || align="left"|Oregon State || align="center"|2 || align="center"|– || 143 || 2,039 || 949 || 64 || 786 || 14.3 || 6.6 || 0.4 || 5.5 || align=center|
|-
|align="left"| || align="center"|G/F || align="left"|Utah State || align="center"|1 || align="center"| || 50 || 350 || 86 || 18 || 186 || 7.0 || 1.7 || 0.4 || 3.7 || align=center|
|-
|align="left"| || align="center"|G || align="left"|Drake || align="center"|1 || align="center"| || 31 || 549 || 82 || 68 || 294 || 17.7 || 2.6 || 2.2 || 9.5 || align=center|
|-
|align="left"| || align="center"|F/C || align="left"|St. John's || align="center"|2 || align="center"| || 47 || 476 || 146 || 13 || 170 || 10.1 || 3.1 || 0.3 || 3.6 || align=center|
|-
|align="left" bgcolor="#FFFF99"|^ || align="center"|F/C || align="left"|USC || align="center"|2 || align="center"|– || 127 ||  || 301 || 248 || 953 ||  || 4.8 || 2.0 || 7.5 || align=center|
|-
|align="left"| || align="center"|G || align="left"|Louisville || align="center"|1 || align="center"| || 10 || 158 || 23 || 12 || 46 || 15.8 || 2.3 || 1.2 || 4.6 || align=center|
|-
|align="left"| || align="center"|F || align="left"|Richmond || align="center"|1 || align="center"| || 3 || 31 || 5 || 2 || 12 || 10.3 || 1.7 || 0.7 || 4.0 || align=center|
|-
|align="left"| || align="center"|F || align="left"|Georgia Tech || align="center"|1 || align="center"| || 81 || 2,541 || 573 || 107 || 958 || 31.4 || 7.1 || 1.3 || 11.8 || align=center|
|-
|align="left"| || align="center"|G || align="left"|Long Beach State || align="center"|1 || align="center"| || 54 || 813 || 71 || 50 || 293 || 15.1 || 1.3 || 0.9 || 5.4 || align=center|
|-
|align="left" bgcolor="#CCFFCC"|x || align="center"|F || align="left"|Tennessee || align="center"|1 || align="center"| || 27 || 944 || 213 || 79 || 492 || 35.0 || 7.9 || 2.9 || 18.2 || align=center|
|-
|align="left"| || align="center"|G || align="left"|New Orleans || align="center"|1 || align="center"| || 6 || 41 || 1 || 0 || 10 || 6.8 || 0.2 || 0.0 || 1.7 || align=center|
|-
|align="left"| || align="center"|G || align="left"|Michigan || align="center"|2 || align="center"|– || 72 || 1,799 || 166 || 169 || 517 || 25.0 || 2.3 || 2.3 || 7.2 || align=center|
|-
|align="left"| || align="center"|F/C || align="left"|Washington || align="center"|4 || align="center"|– || 253 || 6,537 || 1,777 || 578 || 2,532 || 25.8 || 7.0 || 2.3 || 10.0 || align=center|
|-
|align="left" bgcolor="#FFCC00"|+ || align="center"|G || align="left"|Bradley || align="center"|5 || align="center"|– || 403 || 14,533 || 1,456 || 1,364 || 7,657 || 36.1 || 3.6 || 3.4 || 19.0 || align=center|
|-
|align="left"| || align="center"|C || align="left"|Idaho State || align="center"|1 || align="center"| || 11 || 101 || 34 || 1 || 22 || 9.2 || 3.1 || 0.1 || 2.0 || align=center|
|-
|align="left"| || align="center"|F || align="left"|Indiana || align="center"|1 || align="center"| || 38 || 418 || 107 || 10 || 119 || 11.0 || 2.8 || 0.3 || 3.1 || align=center|
|-
|align="left"| || align="center"|G || align="left"|Duke || align="center"|1 || align="center"| || 22 || 351 || 35 || 34 || 126 || 16.0 || 1.6 || 1.5 || 5.7 || align=center|
|-
|align="left"| || align="center"|G || align="left"|VCU || align="center"|2 || align="center"|– || 134 || 2,422 || 165 || 358 || 1,006 || 18.1 || 1.2 || 2.7 || 7.5 || align=center|
|-
|align="left"| || align="center"|G || align="left"|Duke || align="center"|1 || align="center"| || 72 || 1,667 || 185 || 112 || 662 || 23.2 || 2.6 || 1.6 || 9.2 || align=center|
|-
|align="left"| || align="center"|F || align="left"|Washington State || align="center"|1 || align="center"| || 29 || 301 || 92 || 3 || 85 || 10.4 || 3.2 || 0.1 || 2.9 || align=center|
|-
|align="left"| || align="center"|G || align="left"|Villanova || align="center"|1 || align="center"| || 21 || 373 || 45 || 27 || 135 || 17.8 || 2.1 || 1.3 || 6.4 || align=center|
|-
|align="left"| || align="center"|C || align="left"|Wisconsin || align="center"|2 || align="center"|– || 49 || 447 || 148 || 8 || 194 || 9.1 || 3.0 || 0.2 || 4.0 || align=center|
|-
|align="left"| || align="center"|F/C || align="left"|Davidson || align="center"|1 || align="center"| || 63 || 757 || 207 || 44 || 383 || 12.0 || 3.3 || 0.7 || 6.1 || align=center|
|-
|align="left"| || align="center"|G/F || align="left"|Duke || align="center"|1 || align="center"| || 6 || 20 || 4 || 4 || 10 || 3.3 || 0.7 || 0.7 || 1.7 || align=center|
|-
|align="left"| || align="center"|G/F || align="left"|Michigan || align="center"|1 || align="center"| || 44 || 916 || 92 || 55 || 351 || 20.8 || 2.1 || 1.3 || 8.0 || align=center|
|-
|align="left"| || align="center"|F || align="left"|Wheeling Jesuit || align="center"|1 || align="center"| || 5 || 40 || 5 || 2 || 9 || 8.0 || 1.0 || 0.4 || 1.8 || align=center|
|-
|align="left"| || align="center"|F || align="left"|Xavier || align="center"|4 || align="center"|– || 189 || 5,601 || 1,589 || 127 || 1,831 || 29.6 || 8.4 || 0.7 || 9.7 || align=center|
|-
|align="left"| || align="center"|F/C || align="left"|Rutgers || align="center"|2 || align="center"|– || 105 || 3,334 || 657 || 87 || 1,394 || 31.8 || 6.3 || 0.8 || 13.3 || align=center|
|-
|align="left" bgcolor="#FFCC00"|+ || align="center"|G || align="left"|UCLA || align="center"|4 || align="center"|– || 298 || 9,790 || 1,064 || 1,726 || 3,994 || 32.9 || 3.6 || 5.8 || 13.4 || align=center|
|-
|align="left"| || align="center"|F || align="left"|Washington || align="center"|1 || align="center"| || 9 || 142 || 14 || 15 || 42 || 15.8 || 1.6 || 1.7 || 4.7 || align=center|
|-
|align="left"| || align="center"|G || align="left"|Arizona State || align="center"|3 || align="center"|– || 190 || 5,207 || 447 || 780 || 2,004 || 27.4 || 2.4 || 4.1 || 10.5 || align=center|
|-
|align="left"| || align="center"|F/C || align="left"|Bowling Green || align="center"|3 || align="center"|– || 156 || 2,641 || 657 || 152 || 1,157 || 16.9 || 4.2 || 1.0 || 7.4 || align=center|
|-
|align="left"| || align="center"|F || align="left"|George Washington || align="center"|2 || align="center"|– || 87 || 1,417 || 302 || 97 || 568 || 16.3 || 3.5 || 1.1 || 6.5 || align=center|
|-
|align="left"| || align="center"|G/F || align="left"|Tulane || align="center"|1 || align="center"| || 13 || 90 || 11 || 3 || 25 || 6.9 || 0.8 || 0.2 || 1.9 || align=center|
|-
|align="left"| || align="center"|F/C || align="left"|Grambling State || align="center"|4 || align="center"|– || 273 || 5,122 || 1,526 || 189 || 2,237 || 18.8 || 5.6 || 0.7 || 8.2 || align=center|
|-
|align="left"| || align="center"|F/C || align="left"|Nebraska || align="center"|2 || align="center"|– || 22 || 83 || 19 || 2 || 29 || 3.8 || 0.9 || 0.1 || 1.3 || align=center|
|-
|align="left"| || align="center"|G || align="left"|Iowa State || align="center"|2 || align="center"|– || 132 || 4,854 || 554 || 863 || 2,391 || 36.8 || 4.2 || 6.5 || 18.1 || align=center|
|-
|align="left" bgcolor="#FFFF99"|^ || align="center"|F || align="left"|Mississippi State || align="center"|1 || align="center"| || 82 || 1,589 || 441 || 115 || 878 || 19.4 || 5.4 || 1.4 || 10.7 || align=center|
|-
|align="left"| || align="center"|G || align="left"|Saint Louis || align="center"|2 || align="center"|– || 100 || 2,006 || 348 || 152 || 956 || 20.1 || 3.5 || 1.5 || 9.6 || align=center|
|-
|align="left"| || align="center"|C || align="left"|DePaul || align="center"|2 || align="center"|– || 139 || 2,917 || 606 || 43 || 871 || 21.0 || 4.4 || 0.3 || 6.3 || align=center|
|}

I to J

|-
|align="left"| || align="center"|F || align="left"|Virginia || align="center"|3 || align="center"|– || 170 || 3,300 || 668 || 184 || 829 || 19.4 || 3.9 || 1.1 || 4.9 || align=center|
|-
|align="left" bgcolor="#FFCC00"|+ || align="center"|G/F || align="left"|Arizona || align="center"|8 || align="center"|– || 615 || 23,216 || 3,593 || 2,991 || 9,422 || 37.7 || 5.8 || 4.9 || 15.3 || align=center|
|-
|align="left"| || align="center"|F || align="left"|Turkey || align="center"|2 || align="center"|– || 76 || 2,001 || 468 || 136 || 1,035 || 26.3 || 6.2 || 1.8 || 13.6 || align=center|
|-
|align="left"| || align="center"|C || align="left"|California || align="center"|2 || align="center"|– || 161 || 4,834 || 1,546 || 429 || 1,827 || 30.0 || 9.6 || 2.7 || 11.3 || align=center|
|-
|align="left" bgcolor="#FFFF99"|^ (#3) || align="center"|G || align="left"|Georgetown || align="center"|12 || align="center"|– || 722 || 29,879 || 2,822 || 4,385 || 19,931 || 41.4 || 3.9 || 6.1 || bgcolor="#CFECEC"|27.6 || align=center|
|-
|align="left"| || align="center"|G || align="left"|Texas || align="center"|3 || align="center"|– || 150 || 1,795 || 159 || 92 || 451 || 12.0 || 1.1 || 0.6 || 3.0 || align=center|
|-
|align="left"| || align="center"|G || align="left"|Notre Dame || align="center"|2 || align="center"|– || 9 || 56 || 4 || 9 || 30 || 6.2 || 0.4 || 1.0 || 3.3 || align=center|
|-
|align="left"| || align="center"|G/F || align="left"|Georgetown || align="center"|1 || align="center"| || 21 || 257 || 42 || 19 || 70 || 12.2 || 2.0 || 0.9 || 3.3 || align=center|
|-
|align="left"| || align="center"|G || align="left"|Ohio State || align="center"|1 || align="center"| || 48 || 1,788 || 227 || 223 || 657 || 37.3 || 4.7 || 4.6 || 13.7 || align=center|
|-
|align="left" bgcolor="#FFCC00"|+ || align="center"|F/C || align="left"|UTPA || align="center"|8 || align="center"|– || 522 || 13,783 || 4,613 || 818 || 5,170 || 26.4 || 8.8 || 1.6 || 9.9 || align=center|
|-
|align="left"| || align="center"|C || align="left"|Temple || align="center"|2 || align="center"|– || 103 || 2,574 || 532 || 99 || 1,175 || 25.0 || 5.2 || 1.0 || 11.4 || align=center|
|-
|align="left"| || align="center"|F || align="left"|Miami (FL) || align="center"|1 || align="center"| || 9 || 41 || 7 || 1 || 12 || 4.6 || 0.8 || 0.1 || 1.3 || align=center|
|-
|align="left"| || align="center"|G || align="left"|Hofstra || align="center"|1 || align="center"| || 12 || 150 || 11 || 16 || 30 || 12.5 || 0.9 || 1.3 || 2.5 || align=center|
|-
|align="left"| || align="center"|F/C || align="left"|Westchester HS (CA) || align="center"|2 || align="center"|– || 125 || 1,700 || 477 || 178 || 543 || 13.6 || 3.8 || 1.4 || 4.3 || align=center|
|-
|align="left"| || align="center"|G/F || align="left"|Dayton || align="center"|1 || align="center"| || 9 || 187 || 26 || 3 || 54 || 20.8 || 2.9 || 0.3 || 6.0 || align=center|
|-
|align="left"| || align="center"|F/C || align="left"|Florida A&M || align="center"|4 || align="center"|– || 245 || 4,363 || 1,079 || 127 || 1,202 || 17.8 || 4.4 || 0.5 || 4.9 || align=center|
|-
|align="left"| || align="center"|F/C || align="left"|St. John's || align="center"|1 || align="center"| || 55 || 756 || 164 || 38 || 264 || 13.7 || 3.0 || 0.7 || 4.8 || align=center|
|-
|align="left"| || align="center"|F || align="left"|Temple || align="center"|2 || align="center"|– || 66 || 522 || 77 || 40 || 263 || 7.9 || 1.2 || 0.6 || 4.0 || align=center|
|-
|align="left"| || align="center"|F/C || align="left"|Tennessee || align="center"|1 || align="center"| || 29 || 549 || 90 || 23 || 160 || 18.9 || 3.1 || 0.8 || 5.5 || align=center|
|-
|align="left"| || align="center"|G || align="left"|Marquette || align="center"|1 || align="center"| || 3 || 15 || 2 || 1 || 0 || 5.0 || 0.7 || 0.3 || 0.0 || align=center|
|-
|align="left"| || align="center"|C || align="left"|Georgia Tech || align="center"|1 || align="center"| || 23 || 126 || 36 || 3 || 26 || 5.5 || 1.6 || 0.1 || 1.1 || align=center|
|-
|align="left" bgcolor="#FFFF99"|^ (#24) || align="center"|F || align="left"|North Carolina || align="center"|8 || align="center"|– || 617 || 15,318 || 2,942 || 1,372 || 6,585 || 24.8 || 4.8 || 2.2 || 10.7 || align=center|
|-
|align="left"| || align="center"|F || align="left"|Washington || align="center"|1 || align="center"| || 44 || 336 || 57 || 16 || 110 || 7.6 || 1.3 || 0.4 || 2.5 || align=center|
|-
|align="left"| || align="center"|F/C || align="left"|Albany State || align="center"|6 || align="center"|– || 482 || 13,686 || 4,454 || 721 || 3,466 || 28.4 || 9.2 || 1.5 || 7.2 || align=center|
|-
|align="left"| || align="center"|F/C || align="left"|Albany State || align="center"|1 || align="center"| || 1 || 3 || 0 || 0 || 1 || 3.0 || 0.0 || 0.0 || 1.0 || align=center|
|-
|align="left"| || align="center"|G || align="left"|Assumption || align="center"|1 || align="center"| || 6 || 41 || 6 || 2 || 19 || 6.8 || 1.0 || 0.3 || 3.2 || align=center|
|-
|align="left"| || align="center"|F || align="left"|Georgia || align="center"|2 || align="center"|– || 98 || 1,004 || 227 || 37 || 361 || 10.2 || 2.3 || 0.4 || 3.7 || align=center|
|-
|align="left"| || align="center"|G/F || align="left"|Toledo || align="center"|2 || align="center"| || 95 || 2,235 || 241 || 270 || 854 || 23.5 || 2.5 || 2.8 || 9.0 || align=center|
|-
|align="left"| || align="center"|F || align="left"|St. John's || align="center"|1 || align="center"| || 42 || 577 || 95 || 33 || 212 || 13.7 || 2.3 || 0.8 || 5.0 || align=center|
|-
|align="left"| || align="center"|G || align="left"|Villanova || align="center"|7 || align="center"|– || 454 || 11,702 || 1,150 || 1,548 || 5,229 || 25.8 || 2.5 || 3.4 || 11.5 || align=center|
|-
|align="left"| || align="center"|F/C || align="left"|Oklahoma State || align="center"|1 || align="center"| || 4 || 106 || 19 || 3 || 44 || 26.5 || 4.8 || 0.8 || 11.0 || align=center|
|-
|align="left"| || align="center"|C || align="left"|Iowa || align="center"|3 || align="center"|– || 177 || 2,673 || 750 || 203 || 1,347 || 19.7 || 4.2 || 1.1 || 7.6 || align=center|
|}

K

|-
|align="left"| || align="center"|F || align="left"|UCLA || align="center"|2 || align="center"|– || 81 || 1,088 || 77 || 43 || 340 || 13.4 || 1.0 || 0.5 || 4.2 || align=center|
|-
|align="left"| || align="center"|G || align="left"|North Carolina || align="center"|1 || align="center"| || 1 || 7 || 0 || 0 || 2 || 7.0 || 0.0 || 0.0 || 2.0 || align=center|
|-
|align="left"| || align="center"|G/F || align="left"|St. Bonaventure || align="center"|3 || align="center"|– || 214 || 4,063 || 709 || 431 || 1,467 || 19.0 || 3.3 || 2.0 || 6.9 || align=center|
|-
|align="left" bgcolor="#FFCC00"|+ || align="center"|F/C || align="left"|Illinois || align="center"|11 || align="center"|– || 834 || 26,014 || 9,506 || 1,779 || 11,699 || 31.2 || 11.4 || 2.1 || 14.0 || align=center|
|-
|align="left"| || align="center"|F || align="left"|Middle Tennessee || align="center"|1 || align="center"| || 68 || 884 || 233 || 19 || 247 || 13.0 || 3.4 || 0.3 || 3.6 || align=center|
|-
|align="left"| || align="center"|F/C || align="left"|UConn || align="center"|1 || align="center"| || 75 || 1,592 || 552 || 73 || 559 || 21.2 || 7.4 || 1.0 || 7.5 || align=center|
|-
|align="left"| || align="center"|G/F || align="left"|Maryland || align="center"|1 || align="center"| || 72 || 1,593 || 216 || 109 || 517 || 22.1 || 3.0 || 1.5 || 7.2 || align=center|
|-
|align="left"| || align="center"|G || align="left"|Western Carolina || align="center"|1 || align="center"| || 7 || 59 || 14 || 5 || 20 || 8.4 || 2.0 || 0.7 || 2.9 || align=center|
|-
|align="left"| || align="center"|G || align="left"|Charleston || align="center"|5 || align="center"|– || 348 || 11,136 || 1,300 || 1,621 || 3,609 || 32.0 || 3.7 || 4.7 || 10.4 || align=center|
|-
|align="left"| || align="center"|C || align="left"|Kansas State || align="center"|1 || align="center"| || 5 || 47 || 17 || 6 || 13 || 9.4 || 3.4 || 1.2 || 2.6 || align=center|
|-
|align="left" bgcolor="#CCFFCC"|x || align="center"|G || align="left"|Turkey || align="center"|2 || align="center"|– || 62 || 759 || 118 || 56 || 302 || 12.2 || 1.9 || 0.9 || 4.9 || align=center|
|-
|align="left"| || align="center"|G/F || align="left"|Creighton || align="center"|5 || align="center"|– || 337 || 9,057 || 1,092 || 523 || 3,527 || 26.9 || 3.2 || 1.6 || 10.5 || align=center|
|-
|align="left"| || align="center"|F || align="left"|UConn || align="center"|1 || align="center"| || 3 || 40 || 6 || 2 || 3 || 13.3 || 2.0 || 0.7 || 1.0 || align=center|
|-
|align="left"| || align="center"|F || align="left"|Croatia || align="center"|2 || align="center"|– || 80 || 1,895 || 305 || 234 || 784 || 23.7 || 3.8 || 2.9 || 9.8 || align=center|
|-
|align="left"| || align="center"|C || align="left"|Little Rock || align="center"|1 || align="center"| || 1 || 16 || 5 || 0 || 3 || 16.0 || 5.0 || 0.0 || 3.0 || align=center|
|-
|align="left"| || align="center"|F || align="left"|Purdue || align="center"|1 || align="center"| || 36 || 569 || 146 || 32 || 351 || 15.8 || 4.1 || 0.9 || 9.8 || align=center|
|-
|align="left"| || align="center"|C || align="left"|Arkansas || align="center"|1 || align="center"| || 73 || 1,861 || 436 || 79 || 386 || 25.5 || 6.0 || 1.1 || 5.3 || align=center|
|-
|align="left"| || align="center"|G/F || align="left"|Duke || align="center"|1 || align="center"| || 3 || 6 || 0 || 1 || 3 || 2.0 || 0.0 || 0.3 || 1.0 || align=center|
|-
|align="left"| || align="center"|F/C || align="left"|Western Kentucky || align="center"|1 || align="center"| || 60 || 1,152 || 287 || 68 || 323 || 19.2 || 4.8 || 1.1 || 5.4 || align=center|
|-
|align="left"| || align="center"|F/C || align="left"|Niagara || align="center"|1 || align="center"| || 82 || 2,530 || 677 || 95 || 898 || 30.9 || 8.3 || 1.2 || 11.0 || align=center|
|-
|align="left"| || align="center"|F/C || align="left"|Wyoming || align="center"|1 || align="center"| || 71 || 1,163 || 282 || 86 || 362 || 16.4 || 4.0 || 1.2 || 5.1 || align=center|
|-
|align="left"| || align="center"|F/C || align="left"|Vanderbilt || align="center"|2 || align="center"|– || 150 || 3,700 || 1,140 || 156 || 724 || 24.7 || 7.6 || 1.0 || 4.8 || align=center|
|-
|align="left"| || align="center"|G || align="left"|UCLA || align="center"|1 || align="center"| || 1 || 2 || 0 || 0 || 0 || 2.0 || 0.0 || 0.0 || 0.0 || align=center|
|-
|align="left"| || align="center"|G/F || align="left"|St. John's || align="center"|1 || align="center"| || 60 ||  ||  || 156 || 332 ||  ||  || 2.6 || 5.5 || align=center|
|-
|align="left" bgcolor="#FFFF99"|^ || align="center"|F/C || align="left"|West Virginia State || align="center"|6 || align="center"|– || 413 || 11,071 || 2,740 || 620 || 3,432 || 26.8 || 6.6 || 1.5 || 8.3 || align=center|
|-
|align="left"| || align="center"|G/F || align="left"|Drake || align="center"|1 || align="center"| || 2 || 10 || 0 || 0 || 2 || 5.0 || 0.0 || 0.0 || 1.0 || align=center|
|-
|align="left"| || align="center"|F || align="left"|Louisville || align="center"|1 || align="center"| || 62 || 802 || 162 || 47 || 232 || 12.9 || 2.6 || 0.8 || 3.7 || align=center|
|-
|align="left"| || align="center"|F/C || align="left"|San Francisco || align="center"|1 || align="center"| || 47 ||  ||  || 29 || 162 ||  ||  || 0.6 || 3.4 || align=center|
|-
|align="left"| || align="center"|F || align="left"|Cincinnati || align="center"|1 || align="center"| || 19 || 131 || 40 || 2 || 40 || 6.9 || 2.1 || 0.1 || 2.1 || align=center|
|-
|align="left"| || align="center"|F/C || align="left"|Louisiana || align="center"|1 || align="center"| || 18 || 234 || 85 || 13 || 148 || 13.0 || 4.7 || 0.7 || 8.2 || align=center|
|-
|align="left"| || align="center"|G || align="left"|St. John's || align="center"|2 || align="center"|– || 106 || 2,684 || 291 || 336 || 1,377 || 25.3 || 2.7 || 3.2 || 13.0 || align=center|
|-
|align="left"| || align="center"|F || align="left"|France || align="center"|2 || align="center"|– || 121 || 1,997 || 221 || 129 || 744 || 16.5 || 1.8 || 1.1 || 6.1 || align=center|
|-
|align="left"| || align="center"|F || align="left"|North Carolina || align="center"|3 || align="center"|– || 200 || 6,380 || 1,451 || 351 || 1,764 || 31.9 || 7.3 || 1.8 || 8.8 || align=center|
|}

M

|-
|align="left"| || align="center"|C || align="left"|Washington || align="center"|3 || align="center"|– || 161 || 1,937 || 510 || 43 || 765 || 12.0 || 3.2 || 0.3 || 4.8 || align=center|
|-
|align="left"| || align="center"|G || align="left"|Butler || align="center"|1 || align="center"| || 4 || 7 || 0 || 1 || 2 || 1.8 || 0.0 || 0.3 || 0.5 || align=center|
|-
|align="left"| || align="center"|G/F || align="left"|Seton Hall || align="center"|2 || align="center"|– || 117 ||  || 110 || 134 || 823 ||  || 1.9 || 1.1 || 7.0 || align=center|
|-
|align="left"| || align="center"|F || align="left"|UCLA || align="center"|1 || align="center"| || 37 || 733 || 140 || 37 || 402 || 19.8 || 3.8 || 1.0 || 10.9 || align=center|
|-
|align="left"| || align="center"|F/C || align="left"|Hampton || align="center"|3 || align="center"|– || 171 || 4,837 || 1,212 || 218 || 1,535 || 28.3 || 7.1 || 1.3 || 9.0 || align=center|
|-
|align="left"| || align="center"|G || align="left"|Mississippi State || align="center"|3 || align="center"|– || 71 || 1,970 || 171 || 107 || 959 || 27.7 || 2.4 || 1.5 || 13.5 || align=center|
|-
|align="left" bgcolor="#FFFF99"|^ (#2) || align="center"|F/C || align="left"|Petersburg HS (VA) || align="center"|5 || align="center"|– || 357 || 11,816 || 4,273 || 451 || 7,511 || 33.1 || 12.0 || 1.3 || 21.0 || align=center|
|-
|align="left"| || align="center"|C || align="left"|Serbia || align="center"|1 || align="center"| || 22 || 305 || 113 || 32 || 180 || 13.9 || 5.1 || 1.5 || 8.2 || align=center|
|-
|align="left"| || align="center"|F || align="left"|UConn || align="center"|1 || align="center"| || 25 || 189 || 40 || 15 || 94 || 7.6 || 1.6 || 0.6 || 3.8 || align=center|
|-
|align="left"| || align="center"|G || align="left"|North Carolina || align="center"|1 || align="center"| || 30 || 400 || 28 || 73 || 111 || 13.3 || 0.9 || 2.4 || 3.7 || align=center|
|-
|align="left"| || align="center"|G || align="left"|Canisius || align="center"|1 || align="center"| || 16 || 131 || 21 || 15 || 59 || 8.2 || 1.3 || 0.9 || 3.7 || align=center|
|-
|align="left"| || align="center"|F || align="left"|Maryland || align="center"|1 || align="center"| || 30 || 804 || 186 || 12 || 296 || 26.8 || 6.2 || 0.4 || 9.9 || align=center|
|-
|align="left"| || align="center"|G || align="left"|Wisconsin || align="center"|1 || align="center"| || 14 || 292 || 23 || 62 || 100 || 20.9 || 1.6 || 4.4 || 7.1 || align=center|
|-
|align="left"| || align="center"|G || align="left"|Florida || align="center"|2 || align="center"| || 99 || 2,842 || 266 || 359 || 1,337 || 28.7 || 2.7 || 3.6 || 13.5 || align=center|
|-
|align="left"| || align="center"|F || align="left"|Dayton || align="center"|2 || align="center"|– || 82 || 1,414 || 279 || 106 || 702 || 17.2 || 3.4 || 1.3 || 8.6 || align=center|
|-
|align="left"| || align="center"|G || align="left"|Florida State || align="center"|1 || align="center"| || 21 || 215 || 15 || 32 || 90 || 10.2 || 0.7 || 1.5 || 4.3 || align=center|
|-
|align="left"| || align="center"|G || align="left"|VCU || align="center"|1 || align="center"| || 8 || 112 || 15 || 12 || 30 || 14.0 || 1.9 || 1.5 || 3.8 || align=center|
|-
|align="left"| || align="center"|F || align="left"|UCLA || align="center"|1 || align="center"| || 67 || 1,916 || 328 || 106 || 660 || 28.6 || 4.9 || 1.6 || 9.9 || align=center|
|-
|align="left" bgcolor="#FFFF99"|^ || align="center"|F/C || align="left"|North Carolina || align="center"|1 || align="center"| || 29 || 609 || 103 || 35 || 294 || 21.0 || 3.6 || 1.2 || 10.1 || align=center|
|-
|align="left"| || align="center"|F || align="left"|North Carolina || align="center"|1 || align="center"| || 3 || 18 || 2 || 0 || 8 || 6.0 || 0.7 || 0.0 || 2.7 || align=center|
|-
|align="left"| || align="center"|F/C || align="left"|Marquette || align="center"|1 || align="center"| || 59 || 636 || 133 || 20 || 113 || 10.8 || 2.3 || 0.3 || 1.9 || align=center|
|-
|align="left"| || align="center"|G || align="left"|Tennessee State || align="center"|1 || align="center"| || 29 || 293 || 37 || 34 || 91 || 10.1 || 1.3 || 1.2 || 3.1 || align=center|
|-
|align="left"| || align="center"|G || align="left"|Arizona || align="center"|4 || align="center"|– || 314 || 6,915 || 901 || 1,462 || 2,010 || 22.0 || 2.9 || 4.7 || 6.4 || align=center|
|-
|align="left"| || align="center"|C || align="left"|Michigan || align="center"|2 || align="center"|– || 104 || 3,418 || 755 || 140 || 1,212 || 32.9 || 7.3 || 1.3 || 11.7 || align=center|
|-
|align="left"| || align="center"|G/F || align="left"|Clemson || align="center"|1 || align="center"| || 52 || 1,319 || 195 || 70 || 476 || 25.4 || 3.8 || 1.3 || 9.2 || align=center|
|-
|align="left"| || align="center"|F || align="left"|Oklahoma State || align="center"|1 || align="center"| || 11 || 41 || 11 || 1 || 15 || 3.7 || 1.0 || 0.1 || 1.4 || align=center|
|-
|align="left"| || align="center"|C || align="left"|Nevada || align="center"|1 || align="center"| || 6 || 61 || 13 || 2 || 18 || 10.2 || 2.2 || 0.3 || 3.0 || align=center|
|-
|align="left" bgcolor="#FFFF99"|^ || align="center"|F/C || align="left"|Indiana || align="center"|3 || align="center"|– || 234 || 8,248 || 2,688 || 955 || 5,046 || 35.2 || 11.5 || 4.1 || 21.6 || align=center|
|-
|align="left"| || align="center"|F/C || align="left"|Alabama || align="center"|1 || align="center"| || 41 || 784 || 127 || 45 || 119 || 19.1 || 3.1 || 1.1 || 2.9 || align=center|
|-
|align="left"| || align="center"|G || align="left"|Temple || align="center"|8 || align="center"|– || 536 || 13,721 || 1,827 || 1,609 || 4,143 || 25.6 || 3.4 || 3.0 || 7.7 || align=center|
|-
|align="left"| || align="center"|F || align="left"|Duke || align="center"|1 || align="center"| || 1 || 15 || 2 || 0 || 2 || 15.0 || 2.0 || 0.0 || 2.0 || align=center|
|-
|align="left"| || align="center"|F/C || align="left"|California || align="center"|3 || align="center"|– || 89 || 876 || 269 || 27 || 265 || 9.8 || 3.0 || 0.3 || 3.0 || align=center|
|-
|align="left"| || align="center"|G || align="left"|Kentucky || align="center"|3 || align="center"|– || 159 || 3,939 || 359 || 149 || 1,442 || 24.8 || 2.3 || 0.9 || 9.1 || align=center|
|-
|align="left"| || align="center"|G || align="left"|Villanova || align="center"|2 || align="center"|– || 144 || 1,450 || 202 || 203 || 640 || 10.1 || 1.4 || 1.4 || 4.4 || align=center|
|-
|align="left"| || align="center"|G || align="left"|Tennessee State || align="center"|1 || align="center"| || 31 || 268 || 29 || 43 || 119 || 8.6 || 0.9 || 1.4 || 3.8 || align=center|
|-
|align="left"| || align="center"|G || align="left"|Utah || align="center"|3 || align="center"|– || 221 || 8,136 || 940 || 1,515 || 3,510 || 36.8 || 4.3 || 6.9 || 15.9 || align=center|
|-
|align="left"| || align="center"|F || align="left"|Michigan State || align="center"|1 || align="center"| || 1 || 2 || 0 || 0 || 0 || 2.0 || 0.0 || 0.0 || 0.0 || align=center|
|-
|align="left" bgcolor="#CCFFCC"|x || align="center"|G || align="left"|SMU || align="center"|1 || align="center"| || 20 || 268 || 35 || 18 || 87 || 13.4 || 1.8 || 0.9 || 4.4 || align=center|
|-
|align="left" bgcolor="#FFCC00"|+ || align="center"|F || align="left"|Toledo || align="center"|9 || align="center"|– || 668 || 16,907 || 3,771 || 1,270 || 7,559 || 25.3 || 5.6 || 1.9 || 11.3 || align=center|
|-
|align="left"| || align="center"|C || align="left"|Kentucky || align="center"|3 || align="center"|– || 84 || 507 || 142 || 6 || 192 || 6.0 || 1.7 || 0.1 || 2.3 || align=center|
|-
|align="left"| || align="center"|G || align="left"|Arizona || align="center"|2 || align="center"|– || 29 || 627 || 44 || 98 || 302 || 21.6 || 1.5 || 3.4 || 10.4 || align=center|
|-
|align="left"| || align="center"|F/C || align="left"|Georgetown || align="center"|1 || align="center"| || 3 || 52 || 13 || 7 || 41 || 17.3 || 4.3 || 2.3 || 13.7 || align=center|
|-
|align="left"| || align="center"|C || align="left"|North Carolina || align="center"|1 || align="center"| || 20 || 337 || 92 || 7 || 67 || 16.9 || 4.6 || 0.4 || 3.4 || align=center|
|-
|align="left"| || align="center"|F || align="left"|La Salle || align="center"|1 || align="center"| ||  ||  ||  ||  ||  ||  ||  ||  ||  || align=center|
|-
|align="left"| || align="center"|G || align="left"|Michigan || align="center"|1 || align="center"| || 12 || 193 || 13 || 31 || 83 || 16.1 || 1.1 || 2.6 || 6.9 || align=center|
|-
|align="left"| || align="center"|F || align="left"|Seton Hall || align="center"|1 || align="center"| || 6 || 21 || 5 || 2 || 13 || 3.5 || 0.8 || 0.3 || 2.2 || align=center|
|-
|align="left"| || align="center"|G || align="left"|Northeastern || align="center"|1 || align="center"| || 60 || 852 || 90 || 89 || 249 || 14.2 || 1.5 || 1.5 || 4.2 || align=center|
|-
|align="left"| || align="center"|F || align="left"|Mississippi State || align="center"|2 || align="center"|– || 59 || 729 || 180 || 12 || 210 || 12.4 || 3.1 || 0.2 || 3.6 || align=center|
|-
|align="left"| || align="center"|C || align="left"|Ohio State || align="center"|1 || align="center"| || 18 || 247 || 60 || 8 || 122 || 13.7 || 3.3 || 0.4 || 6.8 || align=center|
|-
|align="left"| || align="center"|F/C || align="left"|Bucknell || align="center"|1 || align="center"| || 47 || 1,041 || 200 || 62 || 349 || 22.1 || 4.3 || 1.3 || 7.4 || align=center|
|-
|align="left" bgcolor="#FFFF99"|^ || align="center"|C || align="left"|Georgetown || align="center"|2 || align="center"|– || 106 || 3,782 || 1,185 || 105 || 1,224 || 35.7 || 11.2 || 1.0 || 11.5 || align=center|
|-
|align="left"| || align="center"|G/F || align="left"|Little Rock || align="center"|1 || align="center"| || 4 || 40 || 10 || 2 || 14 || 10.0 || 2.5 || 0.5 || 3.5 || align=center|
|}

N to P

|-
|align="left"| || align="center"|F || align="left"|TCU || align="center"|1 || align="center"| || 22 || 237 || 42 || 7 || 93 || 10.8 || 1.9 || 0.3 || 4.2 || align=center|
|-
|align="left"| || align="center"|C || align="left"|Wofford || align="center"|1 || align="center"| || 67 || 899 || 257 || 24 || 312 || 13.4 || 3.8 || 0.4 || 4.7 || align=center|
|-
|align="left"| || align="center"|G || align="left"|Stanford || align="center"|4 || align="center"|– || 271 || 5,919 || 742 || 833 || 2,564 || 21.8 || 2.7 || 3.1 || 9.5 || align=center|
|-
|align="left"| || align="center"|F/C || align="left"|Arizona State || align="center"|1 || align="center"| || 38 || 314 || 61 || 6 || 90 || 8.3 || 1.6 || 0.2 || 2.4 || align=center|
|-
|align="left"| || align="center"|F || align="left"|Argentina || align="center"|2 || align="center"|– || 65 || 987 || 183 || 46 || 344 || 15.2 || 2.8 || 0.7 || 5.3 || align=center|
|-
|align="left"| || align="center"|F/C || align="left"|Kentucky || align="center"|3 || align="center"|– || 171 || 4,840 || 1,297 || 280 || 1,748 || 28.3 || 7.6 || 1.6 || 10.2 || align=center|
|-
|align="left"| || align="center"|G || align="left"|Arizona || align="center"|2 || align="center"|– || 77 || 890 || 113 || 70 || 434 || 11.6 || 1.5 || 0.9 || 5.6 || align=center|
|-
|align="left"| || align="center"|F/C || align="left"|Loyola (IL) || align="center"|1 || align="center"| || 5 || 24 || 2 || 2 || 1 || 4.8 || 0.4 || 0.4 || 0.2 || align=center|
|-
|align="left"| || align="center"|F || align="left"|UC Santa Barbara || align="center"|1 || align="center"| || 9 || 111 || 11 || 6 || 26 || 12.3 || 1.2 || 0.7 || 2.9 || align=center|
|-
|align="left"| || align="center"|F || align="left"|Santa Clara || align="center"|2 || align="center"|– || 74 || 490 || 106 || 48 || 257 || 6.6 || 1.4 || 0.6 || 3.5 || align=center|
|-
|align="left"| || align="center"|F/C || align="left"|Duke || align="center"|3 || align="center"|– || 105 || 2,750 || 622 || 124 || 1,528 || 26.2 || 5.9 || 1.2 || 14.6 || align=center|
|-
|align="left"| || align="center"|G || align="left"|Georgia Tech || align="center"|2 || align="center"|– || 107 || 1,079 || 110 || 108 || 360 || 10.1 || 1.0 || 1.0 || 3.4 || align=center|
|-
|align="left"| || align="center"|G || align="left"|UConn || align="center"|6 || align="center"|–– || 280 || 3,500 || 313 || 455 || 755 || 12.5 || 1.1 || 1.6 || 2.7 || align=center|
|-
|align="left"| || align="center"|F/C || align="left"|Kentucky || align="center"|1 || align="center"| || 22 || 251 || 61 || 15 || 65 || 11.4 || 2.8 || 0.7 || 3.0 || align=center|
|-
|align="left"| || align="center"|F || align="left"|Western Kentucky || align="center"|1 || align="center"| || 4 || 21 || 9 || 1 || 5 || 5.3 || 2.3 || 0.3 || 1.3 || align=center|
|-
|align="left"| || align="center"|F/C || align="left"|Illinois || align="center"|4 || align="center"|– || 204 || 5,187 || 1,218 || 346 || 1,436 || 25.4 || 6.0 || 1.7 || 7.0 || align=center|
|-
|align="left"| || align="center"|G || align="left"|La Salle || align="center"|3 || align="center"|– || 94 || 948 || 84 || 142 || 289 || 10.1 || 0.9 || 1.5 || 3.1 || align=center|
|-
|align="left"| || align="center"|G/F || align="left"|Syracuse || align="center"|1 || align="center"| || 46 || 919 || 192 || 59 || 271 || 20.0 || 4.2 || 1.3 || 5.9 || align=center|
|-
|align="left"| || align="center"|G/F || align="left"|Holy Cross || align="center"|4 || align="center"|– || 187 || 2,904 || 710 || 153 || 1,655 || 15.5 || 3.8 || 0.8 || 8.9 || align=center|
|-
|align="left"| || align="center"|G || align="left"|Gonzaga || align="center"|1 || align="center"| || 14 || 208 || 17 || 28 || 69 || 14.9 || 1.2 || 2.0 || 4.9 || align=center|
|-
|align="left"| || align="center"|G || align="left"|Bradley || align="center"|2 || align="center"|– || 39 || 199 || 26 || 19 || 74 || 5.1 || 0.7 || 0.5 || 1.9 || align=center|
|-
|align="left"| || align="center"|C || align="left"|Creighton || align="center"|1 || align="center"| || 3 || 21 || 6 || 3 || 5 || 7.0 || 2.0 || 1.0 || 1.7 || align=center|
|-
|align="left"| || align="center"|G/F || align="left"|Louisville || align="center"|4 || align="center"|– || 144 || 1,167 || 170 || 61 || 508 || 8.1 || 1.2 || 0.4 || 3.5 || align=center|
|-
|align="left"| || align="center"|F/C || align="left"|Temple || align="center"|4 || align="center"|– || 211 || 4,973 || 915 || 234 || 1,545 || 23.6 || 4.3 || 1.1 || 7.3 || align=center|
|-
|align="left"| || align="center"|C || align="left"|Cornell || align="center"|2 || align="center"|– || 79 ||  || 38 || 41 || 525 ||  || 2.2 || 0.5 || 6.6 || align=center|
|-
|align="left"| || align="center"|F || align="left"|Villanova || align="center"|1 || align="center"| || 27 || 679 || 176 || 22 || 150 || 25.1 || 6.5 || 0.8 || 5.6 || align=center|
|-
|align="left"| || align="center"|F || align="left"|Kentucky || align="center"|1 || align="center"| || 6 || 157 || 29 || 5 || 64 || 26.2 || 4.8 || 0.8 || 10.7 || align=center|
|-
|align="left"| || align="center"|G || align="left"|Missouri || align="center"|1 || align="center"| || 14 || 170 || 23 || 46 || 55 || 12.1 || 1.6 || 3.3 || 3.9 || align=center|
|-
|align="left"| || align="center"|G || align="left"|Illinois || align="center"|1 || align="center"| || 57 || 751 || 117 || 71 || 288 || 13.2 || 2.1 || 1.2 || 5.1 || align=center|
|-
|align="left"| || align="center"|G || align="left"|Kansas || align="center"|1 || align="center"| || 5 || 36 || 1 || 11 || 1 || 7.2 || 0.2 || 2.2 || 0.2 || align=center|
|-
|align="left"| || align="center"|G || align="left"|Kansas State || align="center"|1 || align="center"| || 3 || 6 || 0 || 0 || 2 || 2.0 || 0.0 || 0.0 || 0.7 || align=center|
|}

R

|-
|align="left"| || align="center"|C || align="left"|Xavier || align="center"|1 || align="center"| || 9 || 68 || 22 || 0 || 18 || 7.6 || 2.4 || 0.0 || 2.0 || align=center|
|-
|align="left"| || align="center"|F || align="left"|NYU || align="center"|1 || align="center"| || 2 || 27 || 7 || 3 || 6 || 13.5 || 3.5 || 1.5 || 3.0 || align=center|
|-
|align="left"| || align="center"|G || align="left"|Stanford || align="center"|1 || align="center"| || 8 || 74 || 5 || 6 || 42 || 9.3 || 0.6 || 0.8 || 5.3 || align=center|
|-
|align="left"| || align="center"|F || align="left"|Duke || align="center"|3 || align="center"|– || 79 || 693 || 198 || 26 || 197 || 8.8 || 2.5 || 0.3 || 2.5 || align=center|
|-
|align="left"| || align="center"|F/C || align="left"|Lindblom Academy (IL) || align="center"|3 || align="center"|– || 194 || 1,356 || 875 || 407 || 1,877 || 20.5 || 6.6 || 2.1 || 9.7 || align=center|
|-
|align="left" bgcolor="#FFCC00"|+ || align="center"|F/C || align="left"|Wyoming || align="center"|5 || align="center"|– || 261 || 7,662 || 1,809 || 175 || 2,598 || 29.4 || 6.9 || 0.7 || 10.0 || align=center|
|-
|align="left"| || align="center"|F || align="left"|Syracuse || align="center"|1 || align="center"| || 28 || 196 || 33 || 29 || 48 || 7.0 || 1.2 || 1.0 || 1.7 || align=center|
|-
|align="left"| || align="center"|G || align="left"|Toledo || align="center"|2 || align="center"| || 8 || 64 || 5 || 5 || 9 || 8.0 || 0.6 || 0.6 || 1.1 || align=center|
|-
|align="left"| || align="center"|C || align="left"|BYU || align="center"|1 || align="center"| || 27 || 177 || 68 || 8 || 55 || 6.6 || 2.5 || 0.3 || 2.0 || align=center|
|-
|align="left"| || align="center"|G || align="left"|Duke || align="center"|2 || align="center"|– || 146 || 4,495 || 364 || 416 || 2,570 || 30.8 || 2.5 || 2.8 || 17.6 || align=center|
|-
|align="left"| || align="center"|G || align="left"|San Francisco || align="center"|1 || align="center"| || 4 || 23 || 1 || 1 || 2 || 5.8 || 0.3 || 0.3 || 0.5 || align=center|
|-
|align="left"| || align="center"|F || align="left"|Winston-Salem State || align="center"|1 || align="center"| || 6 || 52 || 11 || 3 || 21 || 8.7 || 1.8 || 0.5 || 3.5 || align=center|
|-
|align="left"| || align="center"|G/F || align="left"|St. Mary's (TX) || align="center"|1 || align="center"| || 3 || 37 || 9 || 4 || 4 || 12.3 || 3.0 || 1.3 || 1.3 || align=center|
|-
|align="left"| || align="center"|C || align="left"|Greece || align="center"|1 || align="center"| || 35 || 144 || 26 || 7 || 52 || 4.1 || 0.7 || 0.2 || 1.5 || align=center|
|-
|align="left"| || align="center"|G || align="left"|Seattle || align="center"|6 || align="center"|– || 426 || 8,198 || 984 || 848 || 2,789 || 19.2 || 2.3 || 2.0 || 6.5 || align=center|
|-
|align="left"| || align="center"|G || align="left"|Michigan State || align="center"|2 || align="center"| || 52 || 1,352 || 193 || 89 || 519 || 26.0 || 3.7 || 1.7 || 10.0 || align=center|
|-

|align="left"| || align="center"|G || align="left"|Tennessee || align="center"|1 || align="center"| || 55 || 1,693 || 133 || 162 || 755 || 30.8 || 3.2 || 2.9 || 13.7 || align=center|
|-
|align="left"| || align="center"|F || align="left"|Ohio State || align="center"|3 || align="center"|– || 181 || 2,908 || 936 || 109 || 1,118 || 16.1 || 5.2 || 0.6 || 6.2 || align=center|
|-
|align="left"| || align="center"|C || align="left"|LSU || align="center"|1 || align="center"| || 5 || 51 || 15 || 3 || 10 || 10.2 || 3.0 || 0.6 || 2.0 || align=center|
|-
|align="left"| || align="center"|F || align="left"|USC || align="center"|3 || align="center"|– || 131 || 4,112 || 787 || 252 || 2,205 || 31.4 || 6.0 || 1.9 || 16.8 || align=center|
|-
|align="left"| || align="center"|F || align="left"|Purdue || align="center"|1 || align="center"| || 42 || 1,336 || 189 || 57 || 698 || 31.8 || 4.5 || 1.4 || 16.6 || align=center|
|-
|align="left"| || align="center"|G/F || align="left"|Michigan || align="center"|1 || align="center"| || 10 || 153 || 25 || 8 || 44 || 15.3 || 2.5 || 0.8 || 4.4 || align=center|
|-
|align="left"| || align="center"|F || align="left"|Kansas || align="center"|1 || align="center"| || 22 || 407 || 170 || 24 || 193 || 18.5 || 7.7 || 1.1 || 8.8 || align=center|
|-
|align="left" bgcolor="#FFCC00"|+ || align="center"|F/C || align="left"|Oregon State || align="center"|4 || align="center"|–– || 279 || 9,353 || 1,964 || 574 || 3,156 || 33.5 || 7.0 || 2.1 || 11.3 || align=center|
|-
|align="left"| || align="center"|G || align="left"|Spain || align="center"|1 || align="center"| || 68 || 1,518 || 157 || 344 || 530 || 22.3 || 2.3 || 5.1 || 7.8 || align=center|
|-
|align="left"| || align="center"|F || align="left"|Wake Forest || align="center"|1 || align="center"| || 28 || 485 || 104 || 26 || 169 || 17.3 || 3.7 || 0.9 || 6.0 || align=center|
|-
|align="left"| || align="center"|F/C || align="left"|Purdue || align="center"|1 || align="center"| || 3 || 7 || 3 || 0 || 3 || 2.3 || 1.0 || 0.0 || 1.0 || align=center|
|-
|align="left"| || align="center"|F || align="left"|Tulsa || align="center"|1 || align="center"| || 15 || 169 || 51 || 5 || 16 || 11.3 || 3.4 || 0.3 || 1.1 || align=center|
|-
|align="left"| || align="center"|G || align="left"|Hawaii || align="center"|1 || align="center"| || 61 || 1,551 || 132 || 269 || 778 || 25.4 || 2.2 || 4.4 || 12.8 || align=center|
|-
|align="left"| || align="center"|F/C || align="left"|Iona || align="center"|2 || align="center"| || 18 || 325 || 75 || 15 || 98 || 18.1 || 4.2 || 0.8 || 5.4 || align=center|
|-
|align="left"| || align="center"|F/C || align="left"|Colorado State || align="center"|2 || align="center"|– || 63 || 1,999 || 481 || 111 || 1,035 || 31.7 || 7.6 || 1.8 || 16.4 || align=center|
|-
|align="left"| || align="center"|G || align="left"|Missouri || align="center"|1 || align="center"| || 25 || 199 || 15 || 15 || 54 || 8.0 || 0.6 || 0.6 || 2.2 || align=center|
|}

S

|-
|align="left"| || align="center"|G || align="left"|Miami (FL) || align="center"|4 || align="center"|– || 281 || 5,159 || 596 || 518 || 1,430 || 18.4 || 2.1 || 1.8 || 5.1 || align=center|
|-
|align="left"| || align="center"|G/F || align="left"|St. John's || align="center"|2 || align="center"|– || 121 || 1,822 || 292 || 107 || 626 || 15.1 || 2.4 || 0.9 || 5.2 || align=center|
|-
|align="left"| || align="center"|G || align="left"|Temple || align="center"|1 || align="center"| || 24 || 116 || 14 || 36 || 20 || 4.8 || 0.6 || 1.5 || 0.8 || align=center|
|-
|align="left"| || align="center"|F || align="left"|Croatia || align="center"|3 || align="center"|– || 172 || 4,835 || 1,119 || 410 || 2,325 || 28.1 || 6.5 || 2.4 || 13.5 || align=center|
|-
|align="left"| || align="center"|G || align="left"|Cincinnati || align="center"|1 || align="center"| || 17 || 82 || 8 || 15 || 9 || 4.8 || 0.5 || 0.9 || 0.5 || align=center|
|-
|align="left"| || align="center"|G/F || align="left"|Le Moyne || align="center"|2 || align="center"| || 17 || 173 || 31 || 14 || 54 || 10.2 || 1.8 || 0.8 || 3.2 || align=center|
|-
|align="left"| || align="center"|G || align="left"|Villanova || align="center"|1 || align="center"| || 11 || 167 || 11 || 15 || 49 || 15.2 || 1.0 || 1.4 || 4.5 || align=center|
|-
|align="left" bgcolor="#FFFF99"|^ (#4) || align="center"|F/C || align="left"|NYU || align="center" bgcolor="#CFECEC"|15 || align="center"|– || 996 || 29,800 || bgcolor="#CFECEC"|11,256 || 3,072 || 18,438 || 34.4 || 12.1 || 3.1 || 18.5 || align=center|
|-
|align="left"| || align="center"|C || align="left"|Colorado State || align="center"|1 || align="center"| || 78 || 1,136 || 354 || 103 || 418 || 14.6 || 4.5 || 1.3 || 5.4 || align=center|
|-
|align="left"| || align="center"|F/C || align="left"|Chattanooga || align="center"|1 || align="center"| || 46 || 702 || 154 || 32 || 233 || 15.3 || 3.3 || 0.7 || 5.1 || align=center|
|-
|align="left"| || align="center"|F || align="left"|Illinois || align="center"|1 || align="center"| || 1 || 1 || 0 || 0 || 2 || 1.0 || 0.0 || 0.0 || 2.0 || align=center|
|-
|align="left"| || align="center"|G || align="left"|San Francisco || align="center"|1 || align="center"| || 31 ||  ||  || 127 || 368 ||  ||  || 4.1 || 11.9 || align=center|
|-
|align="left" bgcolor="#CCFFCC"|x || align="center"|F || align="left"|Virginia || align="center"|1 || align="center"| || 27 || 647 || 102 || 22 || 211 || 24.0 || 3.8 || 0.8 || 7.8 || align=center|
|-
|align="left"| || align="center"|G/F || align="left"|Furman || align="center"|1 || align="center"| || 19 || 217 || 48 || 30 || 103 || 11.4 || 2.5 || 1.6 || 5.4 || align=center|
|-
|align="left" bgcolor="#FFCC00"|+ || align="center"|G/F || align="left"|Toledo || align="center"|11 || align="center"|– || 600 || 14,667 || 1,694 || 2,335 || 5,760 || 30.1 || 3.1 || 3.9 || 9.6 || align=center|
|-
|align="left"| || align="center"|F/C || align="left"|NC State || align="center"|2 || align="center"|– || 120 || 1,967 || 620 || 72 || 664 || 16.4 || 5.2 || 0.6 || 5.5 || align=center|
|-
|align="left" bgcolor="#FFCC00"|+ || align="center"|F || align="left"|North Carolina || align="center"|3 || align="center"|– || 196 || 5,488 || 1,240 || 232 || 3,291 || 28.0 || 6.3 || 1.2 || 16.8 || align=center|
|-
|align="left"| || align="center"|G || align="left"|Wichita State || align="center"|1 || align="center"| || 54 || 1,108 || 78 || 59 || 449 || 20.5 || 1.4 || 1.1 || 8.3 || align=center|
|-
|align="left"| || align="center"|G || align="left"|UC Santa Barbara || align="center"|1 || align="center"| || 20 || 502 || 64 || 88 || 121 || 25.1 || 3.2 || 4.4 || 6.1 || align=center|
|-
|align="left"| || align="center"|C || align="left"|Toledo || align="center"|1 || align="center"| || 9 || 14 || 3 || 0 || 2 || 1.6 || 0.3 || 0.0 || 0.2 || align=center|
|-
|align="left"| || align="center"|G || align="left"|South Alabama || align="center"|1 || align="center"| || 3 || 18 || 0 || 2 || 0 || 6.0 || 0.0 || 0.7 || 0.0 || align=center|
|-
|align="left"| || align="center"|G || align="left"|Russia || align="center"|1 || align="center"| || 17 || 285 || 22 || 46 || 169 || 16.8 || 1.3 || 2.7 || 9.9 || align=center|
|-
|align="left"| || align="center"|G || align="left"|Northern Illinois || align="center"|1 || align="center"| || 2 || 39 || 4 || 3 || 11 || 19.5 || 2.0 || 1.5 || 5.5 || align=center|
|-
|align="left" bgcolor="#FBCEB1"|* || align="center"|G/F || align="left"|LSU || align="center"|2 || align="center"|– || 160 || 5,432 || 1,356 || 1,271 || 2,616 || 34.0 || 8.5 || bgcolor="#CFECEC"|7.9 || 16.4 || align=center|
|-
|align="left"| || align="center"|F/C || align="left"|Flushing HS (NY) || align="center"|1 || align="center"| ||  ||  ||  ||  ||  ||  ||  ||  ||  || align=center|
|-
|align="left"| || align="center"|G/F || align="left"|Houston || align="center"|1 || align="center"| || 15 || 219 || 26 || 33 || 83 || 14.6 || 1.7 || 2.2 || 5.5 || align=center|
|-
|align="left"| || align="center"|G/F || align="left"|Michigan State || align="center"|1 || align="center"| || 37 || 452 || 35 || 58 || 202 || 12.2 || 0.9 || 1.6 || 5.5 || align=center|
|-
|align="left"| || align="center"|C || align="left"|Georgetown || align="center"|2 || align="center"|– || 99 || 2,106 || 540 || 126 || 892 || 21.3 || 5.5 || 1.3 || 9.0 || align=center|
|-
|align="left"| || align="center"|G || align="left"|Michigan State || align="center"|1 || align="center"| || 10 || 236 || 16 || 38 || 63 || 23.6 || 1.6 || 3.8 || 6.3 || align=center|
|-
|align="left"| || align="center"|G || align="left"|UMass || align="center"|2 || align="center"|– || 24 || 319 || 44 || 42 || 101 || 13.3 || 1.8 || 1.8 || 4.2 || align=center|
|-
|align="left"| || align="center"|F || align="left"|Baylor || align="center"|2 || align="center"| || 101 || 1,627 || 428 || 24 || 510 || 16.1 || 4.2 || 0.2 || 5.0 || align=center|
|-
|align="left"| || align="center"|G/F || align="left"|Appalachian State || align="center"|1 || align="center"| || 16 ||  || 48 || 36 || 124 ||  || 3.0 || 2.3 || 7.8 || align=center|
|-
|align="left"| || align="center"|G/F || align="left"|Louisville || align="center"|2 || align="center"|– || 111 || 2,100 || 258 || 177 || 947 || 18.9 || 2.3 || 1.6 || 8.5 || align=center|
|-
|align="left"| || align="center"|G || align="left"|Dayton || align="center"|1 || align="center"| || 54 || 538 || 30 || 47 || 283 || 10.0 || 0.6 || 0.9 || 5.2 || align=center|
|-
|align="left"| || align="center"|G || align="left"|Wake Forest || align="center"|2 || align="center"|– || 75 || 2,299 || 286 || 500 || 1,034 || 30.7 || 3.8 || 6.7 || 13.8 || align=center|
|-
|align="left"| || align="center"|C || align="left"|LSU || align="center"|1 || align="center"| || 11 || 110 || 14 || 5 || 55 || 10.0 || 1.3 || 0.5 || 5.0 || align=center|
|-
|align="left"| || align="center"|F/C || align="left"|Colorado State || align="center"|2 || align="center"| || 132 || 1,765 || 365 || 53 || 529 || 13.4 || 2.8 || 0.4 || 4.0 || align=center|
|-
|align="left"| || align="center"|F || align="left"|Maryland || align="center"|2 || align="center"| || 84 || 2,054 || 493 || 73 || 806 || 24.5 || 5.9 || 0.9 || 9.6 || align=center|
|-
|align="left"| || align="center"|F || align="left"|La Salle || align="center"|1 || align="center"| || 8 || 28 || 6 || 0 || 5 || 3.5 || 0.8 || 0.0 || 0.6 || align=center|
|-
|align="left"|  || align="center"|G || align="left"|Texas Tech || align="center"|1 || align="center"| || 6 || 111 || 13 || 10 || 40 || 18.5 || 2.2 || 1.7 || 6.7 || align=center|
|-
|align="left"| || align="center"|G || align="left"|Michigan State || align="center"|7 || align="center"|– || 452 || 15,465 || 1,463 || 2,965 || 4,375 || 34.2 || 3.2 || 6.6 || 9.7 || align=center|
|-
|align="left"| || align="center"|F || align="left"|Wake Forest || align="center"|1 || align="center"| || 10 || 71 || 10 || 2 || 16 || 7.1 || 1.0 || 0.2 || 1.6 || align=center|
|-
|align="left"| || align="center"|F || align="left"|Ohio State || align="center"|1 || align="center"| || 48 || 626 || 173 || 31 || 285 || 13.0 || 3.6 || 0.6 || 5.9 || align=center|
|-
|align="left"| || align="center"|G/F || align="left"|Duke || align="center"|1 || align="center"| || 40 || 442 || 54 || 51 || 198 || 11.1 || 1.4 || 1.3 || 5.0 || align=center|
|-
|align="left"| || align="center"|F/C || align="left"|Florida || align="center"|3 || align="center"|– || 205 || 3,013 || 755 || 96 || 1,484 || 14.7 || 3.7 || 0.5 || 7.2 || align=center|
|-
|align="left"| || align="center"|F/C || align="left"|Brazil || align="center"|1 || align="center"| || 8 || 76 || 22 || 4 || 39 || 9.5 || 2.8 || 0.5 || 4.9 || align=center|
|-
|align="left"| || align="center"|G/F || align="left"|North Carolina || align="center"|3 || align="center"|– || 175 || 6,615 || 679 || 598 || 3,416 || 37.8 || 3.9 || 3.4 || 19.5 || align=center|
|-
|align="left"| || align="center"|G || align="left"|Michigan || align="center"|3 || align="center"|– || 159 || 4,042 || 410 || 327 || 1,377 || 25.4 || 2.6 || 2.1 || 8.7 || align=center|
|-
|align="left"| || align="center"|F || align="left"|Cal State Bakersfield || align="center"|1 || align="center"| || 15 || 110 || 31 || 2 || 40 || 7.3 || 2.1 || 0.1 || 2.7 || align=center|
|-
|align="left"| || align="center"|F/C || align="left"|Iowa || align="center"|1 || align="center"| || 31 || 350 || 57 || 17 || 126 || 11.3 || 1.8 || 0.5 || 4.1 || align=center|
|-
|align="left"| || align="center"|G || align="left"|Oral Roberts || align="center"|1 || align="center"| || 30 || 465 || 35 || 63 || 190 || 15.5 || 1.2 || 2.1 || 6.3 || align=center|
|}

T to V

|-
|align="left"| || align="center"|F || align="left"|Memphis || align="center"|1 || align="center"| || 2 || 13 || 0 || 1 || 7 || 6.5 || 0.0 || 0.5 || 3.5 || align=center|
|-
|align="left"| || align="center"|F || align="left"|Texas || align="center"|1 || align="center"| || 15 || 124 || 31 || 1 || 22 || 8.3 || 2.1 || 0.1 || 1.5 || align=center|
|-
|align="left"| || align="center"|F || align="left"|New Mexico || align="center"|3 || align="center"|– || 167 || 5,435 || 1,450 || 261 || 2,006 || 32.5 || 8.7 || 1.6 || 12.0 || align=center|
|-
|align="left"| || align="center"|F || align="left"|San Diego State || align="center"|1 || align="center"| || 17 || 194 || 56 || 7 || 45 || 11.4 || 3.3 || 0.4 || 2.6 || align=center|
|-
|align="left"| || align="center"|F || align="left"|Villanova || align="center"|2 || align="center"|– || 94 || 1,967 || 321 || 105 || 923 || 20.9 || 3.4 || 1.1 || 9.8 || align=center|
|-
|align="left"| || align="center"|G/F || align="left"|Georgetown || align="center"|4 || align="center"|– || 256 || 6,233 || 801 || 283 || 2,016 || 24.3 || 3.1 || 1.1 || 7.9 || align=center|
|-
|align="left"| || align="center"|F/C || align="left"|Texas || align="center"|1 || align="center"| || 44 || 773 || 199 || 26 || 85 || 17.6 || 4.5 || 0.6 || 1.9 || align=center|
|-
|align="left"| || align="center"|G/F || align="left"|Tulane || align="center"|1 || align="center"| || 23 || 432 || 63 || 24 || 179 || 18.8 || 2.7 || 1.0 || 7.8 || align=center|
|-
|align="left"| || align="center"|F/C || align="left"|UC Irvine || align="center"|3 || align="center"|– || 151 || 1,549 || 324 || 43 || 397 || 10.3 || 2.1 || 0.3 || 2.6 || align=center|
|-
|align="left"| || align="center"|G || align="left"|West Virginia Tech || align="center"|4 || align="center"|– || 225 || 4,190 || 317 || 491 || 1,555 || 18.6 || 1.4 || 2.2 || 6.9 || align=center|
|-
|align="left" bgcolor="#FFCC00"|+ || align="center"|G || align="left"|Louisiana || align="center"|8 || align="center"|– || 468 || 12,608 || 1,009 || 1,965 || 7,458 || 26.9 || 2.2 || 4.2 || 15.9 || align=center|
|-
|align="left"| || align="center"|F || align="left"|Marquette || align="center"|1 || align="center"| || 23 || 124 || 34 || 12 || 55 || 5.4 || 1.5 || 0.5 || 2.4 || align=center|
|-
|align="left"| || align="center"|F || align="left"|UNLV || align="center"|1 || align="center"| || 39 || 854 || 186 || 47 || 419 || 21.9 || 4.8 || 1.2 || 10.7 || align=center|
|-
|align="left"| || align="center"|F || align="left"|UC Santa Barbara || align="center"|1 || align="center"| || 39 || 623 || 111 || 30 || 119 || 16.0 || 2.8 || 0.8 || 3.1 || align=center|
|-
|align="left"| || align="center"|F || align="left"|Duquesne || align="center"|3 || align="center"|– || 99 || 1,301 || 349 || 52 || 407 || 13.1 || 3.5 || 0.5 || 4.1 || align=center|
|-
|align="left"| || align="center"|G || align="left"|Memphis || align="center"|1 || align="center"| || 70 || 1,407 || 152 || 311 || 412 || 20.1 || 2.2 || 4.4 || 5.9 || align=center|
|-
|align="left"| || align="center"|G || align="left"|Ohio State || align="center"|4 || align="center"|– || 279 || 8,288 || 1,521 || 891 || 3,208 || 29.7 || 5.5 || 3.2 || 11.5 || align=center|
|-
|align="left"| || align="center"|G || align="left"|Texas || align="center"|1 || align="center"| || 55 || 809 || 62 || 174 || 195 || 14.7 || 1.1 || 3.2 || 3.5 || align=center|
|-
|align="left"| || align="center"|G/F || align="left"|Indiana || align="center"|3 || align="center"|– || 117 || 4,343 || 607 || 280 || 2,182 || 37.1 || 5.2 || 2.4 || 18.6 || align=center|
|-
|align="left"| || align="center"|F || align="left"|Utah || align="center"|1 || align="center"| || 74 || 2,337 || 524 || 93 || 1,176 || 31.6 || 7.1 || 1.3 || 15.9 || align=center|
|-
|align="left"| || align="center"|F || align="left"|Mississippi State || align="center"|1 || align="center"| || 23 || 337 || 63 || 13 || 99 || 14.7 || 2.7 || 0.6 || 4.3 || align=center|
|-
|align="left"| || align="center"|F || align="left"|Michigan State || align="center"|1 || align="center"| || 17 || 259 || 36 || 8 || 124 || 15.2 || 2.1 || 0.5 || 7.3 || align=center|
|-
|align="left"| || align="center"|F || align="left"|Utah || align="center"|2 || align="center"|– || 115 || 1,589 || 263 || 66 || 261 || 13.8 || 2.3 || 0.6 || 2.3 || align=center|
|-
|align="left"| || align="center"|C || align="left"|USC || align="center"|1 || align="center"| || 51 || 812 || 246 || 31 || 283 || 15.9 || 4.8 || 0.6 || 5.5 || align=center|
|}

W

|-
|align="left" bgcolor="#FFFF99"|^ || align="center"|G/F || align="left"|Bradley || align="center"|7 || align="center"|– || 558 || 17,624 || 4,416 || 1,029 || 9,043 || 31.6 || 7.9 || 1.8 || 16.2 || align=center|
|-
|align="left"| || align="center"|G || align="left"|Kansas || align="center"|3 || align="center"|– || 111 || 1,691 || 164 || 229 || 597 || 15.2 || 1.5 || 2.1 || 5.4 || align=center|
|-
|align="left"| || align="center"|G || align="left"|Georgia Southern || align="center"|1 || align="center"| || 5 || 70 || 8 || 16 || 10 || 14.0 || 1.6 || 3.2 || 2.0 || align=center|
|-
|align="left"| || align="center"|G || align="left"|Boston College || align="center"|1 || align="center"| || 66 || 838 || 89 || 80 || 173 || 12.7 || 1.3 || 1.2 || 2.6 || align=center|
|-
|align="left"| || align="center"|G || align="left"|Long Beach State || align="center"|1 || align="center"| || 9 || 116 || 9 || 10 || 48 || 12.9 || 1.0 || 1.1 || 5.3 || align=center|
|-
|align="left"| || align="center"|G/F || align="left"|Tennessee State || align="center"|4 || align="center"|– || 170 || 2,852 || 984 || 128 || 1,089 || 16.8 || 5.8 || 0.8 || 6.4 || align=center|
|-
|align="left"| || align="center"|F/C || align="left"|Villanova || align="center"|3 || align="center"|– || 174 || 5,505 || 1,616 || 226 || 2,246 || 31.6 || 9.3 || 1.3 || 12.9 || align=center|
|-
|align="left"| || align="center"|F/C || align="left"|Old Dominion || align="center"|1 || align="center"| || 14 || 38 || 14 || 1 || 19 || 2.7 || 1.0 || 0.1 || 1.4 || align=center|
|-
|align="left"| || align="center"|G || align="left"|Villanova || align="center"|1 || align="center"| || 21 || 165 || 5 || 20 || 56 || 7.9 || 0.2 || 1.0 || 2.7 || align=center|
|-
|align="left"| || align="center"|F || align="left"|Southern Miss || align="center"|6 || align="center"|– || 448 || 16,127 || 3,715 || 892 || 6,867 || 36.0 || 8.3 || 2.0 || 15.3 || align=center|
|-
|align="left"| || align="center"|F/C || align="left"|Michigan || align="center"|3 || align="center"|– || 114 || 4,139 || 1,055 || 383 || 2,044 || 36.3 || 9.3 || 3.4 || 17.9 || align=center|
|-
|align="left"| || align="center"|G/F || align="left"|Arkansas || align="center"|1 || align="center"| || 7 || 78 || 12 || 2 || 17 || 11.1 || 1.7 || 0.3 || 2.4 || align=center|
|-
|align="left"| || align="center"|G || align="left"|Penn State || align="center"|2 || align="center"|– || 13 || 59 || 10 || 14 || 18 || 4.5 || 0.8 || 1.1 || 1.4 || align=center|
|-
|align="left"| || align="center"|C || align="left"|Washington || align="center"|2 || align="center"|– || 82 || 975 || 217 || 34 || 294 || 11.9 || 2.6 || 0.4 || 3.6 || align=center|
|-
|align="left"| || align="center"|C || align="left"|Kansas || align="center"|1 || align="center"| || 4 || 33 || 8 || 1 || 12 || 8.3 || 2.0 || 0.3 || 3.0 || align=center|
|-
|align="left"| || align="center"|G/F || align="left"|Villanova || align="center"|1 || align="center"| || 23 || 196 || 42 || 12 || 79 || 8.5 || 1.8 || 0.5 || 3.4 || align=center|
|-
|align="left"| || align="center"|G || align="left"|Florida State || align="center"|1 || align="center"| || 49 || 569 || 94 || 22 || 211 || 11.6 || 1.9 || 0.4 || 4.3 || align=center|
|-
|align="left"| || align="center"|G/F || align="left"|Georgia || align="center"|1 || align="center"| || 61 || 1,095 || 105 || 91 || 388 || 18.0 || 1.7 || 1.5 || 6.4 || align=center|
|-
|align="left"| || align="center"|F/C || align="left"|Gardner-Webb || align="center"|1 || align="center"| || 26 || 192 || 40 || 2 || 158 || 7.4 || 1.5 || 0.1 || 6.1 || align=center|
|-
|align="left"| || align="center"|G || align="left"|Memphis || align="center"|1 || align="center"| || 67 || 1,157 || 130 || 72 || 404 || 17.3 || 1.9 || 1.1 || 6.0 || align=center|
|-
|align="left"| || align="center"|F/C || align="left"|St. John's || align="center"|2 || align="center"|– || 102 || 1,154 || 256 || 28 || 388 || 11.3 || 2.5 || 0.3 || 3.8 || align=center|
|-
|align="left"| || align="center"|G || align="left"|South Gwinnett HS (GA) || align="center"|7 || align="center"|– || 455 || 9,955 || 912 || 1,356 || 5,158 || 21.9 || 2.0 || 3.0 || 11.3 || align=center|
|-
|align="left"| || align="center"|F || align="left"|Notre Dame || align="center"|1 || align="center"| || 21 || 276 || 45 || 26 || 92 || 13.1 || 2.1 || 1.2 || 4.4 || align=center|
|-
|align="left"| || align="center"|F || align="left"|Arizona State || align="center"|2 || align="center"|– || 116 || 1,863 || 432 || 71 || 616 || 16.1 || 3.7 || 0.6 || 5.3 || align=center|
|-
|align="left"| || align="center"|F/C || align="left"|North Carolina || align="center"|5 || align="center"|– || 212 || 4,109 || 1,141 || 135 || 1,130 || 19.4 || 5.4 || 0.6 || 5.3 || align=center|
|-
|align="left"| || align="center"|F || align="left"|Arkansas || align="center"|1 || align="center"| || 48 || 1,056 || 178 || 43 || 518 || 22.0 || 3.7 || 0.9 || 10.8 || align=center|
|-
|align="left"| || align="center"|C || align="left"|Cincinnati || align="center"|2 || align="center"|– || 105 || 1,388 || 533 || 84 || 580 || 13.2 || 5.1 || 0.8 || 5.5 || align=center|
|-
|align="left"| || align="center"|F || align="left"|UCLA || align="center"|1 || align="center"| || 6 || 79 || 14 || 4 || 23 || 13.2 || 2.3 || 0.7 || 3.8 || align=center|
|-
|align="left"| || align="center"|G/F || align="left"|Georgetown || align="center"|3 || align="center"|– || 171 || 3,403 || 294 || 347 || 1,362 || 19.9 || 1.7 || 2.0 || 8.0 || align=center|
|-
|align="left"| || align="center"|F || align="left"|Bradley || align="center"|1 || align="center"| || 4 || 17 || 3 || 0 || 6 || 4.3 || 0.8 || 0.0 || 1.5 || align=center|
|-
|align="left"| || align="center"|G || align="left"|Penn || align="center"|1 || align="center"| || 79 || 1,628 || 150 || 228 || 642 || 20.6 || 1.9 || 2.9 || 8.1 || align=center|
|-
|align="left"| || align="center"|F || align="left"|UNLV || align="center"|1 || align="center"| || 17 || 145 || 38 || 3 || 61 || 8.5 || 2.2 || 0.2 || 3.6 || align=center|
|-
|align="left"| || align="center"|G || align="left"|Cal State Fullerton || align="center"|2 || align="center"|– || 67 || 724 || 45 || 120 || 276 || 10.8 || 0.7 || 1.8 || 4.1 || align=center|
|-
|align="left"| || align="center"|F || align="left"|Notre Dame || align="center"|1 || align="center"| || 74 || 1,955 || 298 || 139 || 937 || 26.4 || 4.0 || 1.9 || 12.7 || align=center|
|-
|align="left"| || align="center"|G/F || align="left"|South Kent School (CT) || align="center"|1 || align="center"| || 79 || 1,783 || 302 || 150 || 729 || 22.6 || 3.8 || 1.9 || 9.2 || align=center|
|-
|align="left"| || align="center"|F/C || align="left"|Clemson || align="center"|2 || align="center"|– || 125 || 3,180 || 771 || 75 || 1,387 || 25.4 || 6.2 || 0.6 || 11.1 || align=center|
|-
|align="left"| || align="center"|G || align="left"|Washington || align="center"|3 || align="center"|– || 110 || 2,804 || 335 || 394 || 1,513 || 25.5 || 3.0 || 3.6 || 13.8 || align=center|
|}

Y

|-
|align="left" bgcolor="#FFFF99"|^ || align="center"|G/F || align="left"|Stanford || align="center"|2 || align="center"|– || 88 || 2,822 || 683 || 147 || 1,724 || 32.1 || 7.8 || 1.7 || 19.6 || align=center|
|-
|align="left"| || align="center"|F || align="left"|Maryland || align="center"|1 || align="center"| || 24 || 144 || 40 || 7 || 69 || 6.0 || 1.7 || 0.3 || 2.9 || align=center|
|-
|align="left"| || align="center"|G/F || align="left"|Kentucky || align="center"|1 || align="center"| || 6 || 61 || 2 || 2 || 17 || 10.2 || 0.3 || 0.3 || 2.8 || align=center|
|-
|align="left"| || align="center"|G/F || align="left"|Houston || align="center"|1 || align="center"| || 2 || 2 || 0 || 0 || 0 || 1.0 || 0.0 || 0.0 || 0.0 || align=center|
|-
|align="left"| || align="center"|G/F || align="left"|USC || align="center"|1 || align="center"| || 59 || 1,411 || 130 || 84 || 628 || 23.9 || 2.2 || 1.4 || 10.6 || align=center|
|-
|align="left"| || align="center"|F || align="left"|Pittsburgh || align="center"|1 || align="center"| || 14 || 135 || 21 || 6 || 40 || 9.6 || 1.5 || 0.4 || 2.9 || align=center|
|-
|align="left"| || align="center"|F || align="left"|Georgia Tech || align="center"|7 || align="center"|– || 516 || 15,516 || 2,845 || 704 || 7,078 || 30.1 || 5.5 || 1.4 || 13.7 || align=center|
|}

External links
 76ers Media Guide (PDF)
 Philadelphia 76ers all-time roster

References

National Basketball Association all-time rosters
 
roster